

255001–255100 

|-bgcolor=#d6d6d6
| 255001 ||  || — || October 2, 2005 || Mount Lemmon || Mount Lemmon Survey || — || align=right | 2.4 km || 
|-id=002 bgcolor=#d6d6d6
| 255002 ||  || — || October 3, 2005 || Palomar || NEAT || — || align=right | 4.8 km || 
|-id=003 bgcolor=#E9E9E9
| 255003 ||  || — || October 1, 2005 || Socorro || LINEAR || — || align=right | 2.6 km || 
|-id=004 bgcolor=#d6d6d6
| 255004 ||  || — || October 1, 2005 || Catalina || CSS || — || align=right | 3.0 km || 
|-id=005 bgcolor=#E9E9E9
| 255005 ||  || — || October 1, 2005 || Mount Lemmon || Mount Lemmon Survey || HEN || align=right | 1.2 km || 
|-id=006 bgcolor=#E9E9E9
| 255006 ||  || — || October 1, 2005 || Kitt Peak || Spacewatch || AST || align=right | 2.6 km || 
|-id=007 bgcolor=#d6d6d6
| 255007 ||  || — || October 1, 2005 || Mount Lemmon || Mount Lemmon Survey || — || align=right | 3.9 km || 
|-id=008 bgcolor=#d6d6d6
| 255008 ||  || — || October 1, 2005 || Mount Lemmon || Mount Lemmon Survey || EOS || align=right | 4.8 km || 
|-id=009 bgcolor=#d6d6d6
| 255009 ||  || — || October 1, 2005 || Mount Lemmon || Mount Lemmon Survey || — || align=right | 3.6 km || 
|-id=010 bgcolor=#d6d6d6
| 255010 ||  || — || October 1, 2005 || Mount Lemmon || Mount Lemmon Survey || — || align=right | 4.4 km || 
|-id=011 bgcolor=#E9E9E9
| 255011 ||  || — || October 2, 2005 || Palomar || NEAT || JUN || align=right | 1.5 km || 
|-id=012 bgcolor=#d6d6d6
| 255012 ||  || — || October 1, 2005 || Socorro || LINEAR || — || align=right | 3.4 km || 
|-id=013 bgcolor=#d6d6d6
| 255013 ||  || — || October 1, 2005 || Kitt Peak || Spacewatch || CHA || align=right | 2.4 km || 
|-id=014 bgcolor=#E9E9E9
| 255014 ||  || — || October 2, 2005 || Mount Lemmon || Mount Lemmon Survey || — || align=right | 2.7 km || 
|-id=015 bgcolor=#d6d6d6
| 255015 ||  || — || October 3, 2005 || Catalina || CSS || EOS || align=right | 3.4 km || 
|-id=016 bgcolor=#E9E9E9
| 255016 ||  || — || October 3, 2005 || Catalina || CSS || HOF || align=right | 4.0 km || 
|-id=017 bgcolor=#d6d6d6
| 255017 ||  || — || October 6, 2005 || Kitt Peak || Spacewatch || — || align=right | 3.3 km || 
|-id=018 bgcolor=#d6d6d6
| 255018 ||  || — || October 7, 2005 || Junk Bond || D. Healy || EOS || align=right | 3.0 km || 
|-id=019 bgcolor=#d6d6d6
| 255019 Fleurmaxwell ||  ||  || October 10, 2005 || Côtes de Meuse || M. Dawson || — || align=right | 2.5 km || 
|-id=020 bgcolor=#E9E9E9
| 255020 ||  || — || October 1, 2005 || Kitt Peak || Spacewatch || — || align=right | 3.3 km || 
|-id=021 bgcolor=#d6d6d6
| 255021 ||  || — || October 1, 2005 || Anderson Mesa || LONEOS || — || align=right | 3.4 km || 
|-id=022 bgcolor=#d6d6d6
| 255022 ||  || — || October 5, 2005 || Socorro || LINEAR || — || align=right | 3.5 km || 
|-id=023 bgcolor=#d6d6d6
| 255023 ||  || — || October 6, 2005 || Kitt Peak || Spacewatch || KOR || align=right | 2.0 km || 
|-id=024 bgcolor=#d6d6d6
| 255024 ||  || — || October 4, 2005 || Mount Lemmon || Mount Lemmon Survey || — || align=right | 3.3 km || 
|-id=025 bgcolor=#d6d6d6
| 255025 ||  || — || October 4, 2005 || Mount Lemmon || Mount Lemmon Survey || — || align=right | 3.0 km || 
|-id=026 bgcolor=#d6d6d6
| 255026 ||  || — || October 6, 2005 || Catalina || CSS || — || align=right | 4.2 km || 
|-id=027 bgcolor=#d6d6d6
| 255027 ||  || — || October 7, 2005 || Kitt Peak || Spacewatch || HYG || align=right | 5.2 km || 
|-id=028 bgcolor=#d6d6d6
| 255028 ||  || — || October 6, 2005 || Mount Lemmon || Mount Lemmon Survey || AGN || align=right | 1.8 km || 
|-id=029 bgcolor=#d6d6d6
| 255029 ||  || — || October 5, 2005 || Catalina || CSS || — || align=right | 3.0 km || 
|-id=030 bgcolor=#d6d6d6
| 255030 ||  || — || October 7, 2005 || Anderson Mesa || LONEOS || — || align=right | 4.2 km || 
|-id=031 bgcolor=#d6d6d6
| 255031 ||  || — || October 2, 2005 || Palomar || NEAT || — || align=right | 3.6 km || 
|-id=032 bgcolor=#d6d6d6
| 255032 ||  || — || October 7, 2005 || Catalina || CSS || KOR || align=right | 2.0 km || 
|-id=033 bgcolor=#E9E9E9
| 255033 ||  || — || October 3, 2005 || Kitt Peak || Spacewatch || HNA || align=right | 3.2 km || 
|-id=034 bgcolor=#FA8072
| 255034 ||  || — || October 4, 2005 || Catalina || CSS || H || align=right data-sort-value="0.71" | 710 m || 
|-id=035 bgcolor=#d6d6d6
| 255035 ||  || — || October 5, 2005 || Mount Lemmon || Mount Lemmon Survey || KOR || align=right | 1.4 km || 
|-id=036 bgcolor=#d6d6d6
| 255036 ||  || — || October 7, 2005 || Catalina || CSS || — || align=right | 4.8 km || 
|-id=037 bgcolor=#E9E9E9
| 255037 ||  || — || October 7, 2005 || Kitt Peak || Spacewatch || AGN || align=right | 1.2 km || 
|-id=038 bgcolor=#E9E9E9
| 255038 ||  || — || October 7, 2005 || Catalina || CSS || HEN || align=right | 1.4 km || 
|-id=039 bgcolor=#d6d6d6
| 255039 ||  || — || October 7, 2005 || Mount Lemmon || Mount Lemmon Survey || — || align=right | 3.0 km || 
|-id=040 bgcolor=#d6d6d6
| 255040 ||  || — || October 8, 2005 || Socorro || LINEAR || — || align=right | 3.8 km || 
|-id=041 bgcolor=#fefefe
| 255041 ||  || — || October 9, 2005 || Kitt Peak || Spacewatch || H || align=right data-sort-value="0.87" | 870 m || 
|-id=042 bgcolor=#d6d6d6
| 255042 ||  || — || October 7, 2005 || Kitt Peak || Spacewatch || K-2 || align=right | 1.5 km || 
|-id=043 bgcolor=#E9E9E9
| 255043 ||  || — || October 7, 2005 || Kitt Peak || Spacewatch || AGN || align=right data-sort-value="0.98" | 980 m || 
|-id=044 bgcolor=#E9E9E9
| 255044 ||  || — || October 7, 2005 || Kitt Peak || Spacewatch || — || align=right | 2.6 km || 
|-id=045 bgcolor=#E9E9E9
| 255045 ||  || — || October 7, 2005 || Kitt Peak || Spacewatch || AST || align=right | 2.0 km || 
|-id=046 bgcolor=#d6d6d6
| 255046 ||  || — || October 7, 2005 || Kitt Peak || Spacewatch || — || align=right | 2.7 km || 
|-id=047 bgcolor=#d6d6d6
| 255047 ||  || — || October 7, 2005 || Kitt Peak || Spacewatch || — || align=right | 3.8 km || 
|-id=048 bgcolor=#d6d6d6
| 255048 ||  || — || October 7, 2005 || Kitt Peak || Spacewatch || — || align=right | 3.9 km || 
|-id=049 bgcolor=#d6d6d6
| 255049 ||  || — || October 6, 2005 || Kitt Peak || Spacewatch || NAE || align=right | 3.3 km || 
|-id=050 bgcolor=#d6d6d6
| 255050 ||  || — || October 6, 2005 || Kitt Peak || Spacewatch || KOR || align=right | 1.7 km || 
|-id=051 bgcolor=#d6d6d6
| 255051 ||  || — || October 8, 2005 || Kitt Peak || Spacewatch || KOR || align=right | 1.6 km || 
|-id=052 bgcolor=#d6d6d6
| 255052 ||  || — || October 8, 2005 || Kitt Peak || Spacewatch || KOR || align=right | 1.8 km || 
|-id=053 bgcolor=#d6d6d6
| 255053 ||  || — || October 8, 2005 || Kitt Peak || Spacewatch || — || align=right | 3.3 km || 
|-id=054 bgcolor=#E9E9E9
| 255054 ||  || — || October 8, 2005 || Kitt Peak || Spacewatch || AGN || align=right | 1.6 km || 
|-id=055 bgcolor=#d6d6d6
| 255055 ||  || — || October 8, 2005 || Kitt Peak || Spacewatch || KOR || align=right | 2.0 km || 
|-id=056 bgcolor=#d6d6d6
| 255056 ||  || — || October 11, 2005 || Kitt Peak || Spacewatch || THB || align=right | 4.0 km || 
|-id=057 bgcolor=#E9E9E9
| 255057 ||  || — || October 9, 2005 || Kitt Peak || Spacewatch || — || align=right | 1.8 km || 
|-id=058 bgcolor=#d6d6d6
| 255058 ||  || — || October 9, 2005 || Kitt Peak || Spacewatch || — || align=right | 3.0 km || 
|-id=059 bgcolor=#d6d6d6
| 255059 ||  || — || October 9, 2005 || Kitt Peak || Spacewatch || HYG || align=right | 3.8 km || 
|-id=060 bgcolor=#d6d6d6
| 255060 ||  || — || October 9, 2005 || Kitt Peak || Spacewatch || — || align=right | 2.8 km || 
|-id=061 bgcolor=#d6d6d6
| 255061 ||  || — || October 9, 2005 || Kitt Peak || Spacewatch || — || align=right | 2.7 km || 
|-id=062 bgcolor=#E9E9E9
| 255062 ||  || — || October 12, 2005 || Kitt Peak || Spacewatch || HOF || align=right | 3.3 km || 
|-id=063 bgcolor=#d6d6d6
| 255063 ||  || — || October 1, 2005 || Anderson Mesa || LONEOS || — || align=right | 4.0 km || 
|-id=064 bgcolor=#d6d6d6
| 255064 ||  || — || October 1, 2005 || Kitt Peak || Spacewatch || KOR || align=right | 1.9 km || 
|-id=065 bgcolor=#d6d6d6
| 255065 ||  || — || October 2, 2005 || Palomar || NEAT || EOS || align=right | 2.7 km || 
|-id=066 bgcolor=#d6d6d6
| 255066 ||  || — || October 5, 2005 || Catalina || CSS || HYG || align=right | 4.3 km || 
|-id=067 bgcolor=#d6d6d6
| 255067 ||  || — || October 1, 2005 || Socorro || LINEAR || — || align=right | 4.9 km || 
|-id=068 bgcolor=#d6d6d6
| 255068 ||  || — || October 21, 2005 || Pla D'Arguines || Pla D'Arguines Obs. || — || align=right | 3.0 km || 
|-id=069 bgcolor=#d6d6d6
| 255069 ||  || — || October 22, 2005 || Junk Bond || D. Healy || — || align=right | 2.7 km || 
|-id=070 bgcolor=#d6d6d6
| 255070 ||  || — || October 26, 2005 || Cordell-Lorenz || Cordell–Lorenz Obs. || — || align=right | 3.3 km || 
|-id=071 bgcolor=#FFC2E0
| 255071 ||  || — || October 28, 2005 || Mount Lemmon || Mount Lemmon Survey || APOPHA || align=right data-sort-value="0.76" | 760 m || 
|-id=072 bgcolor=#d6d6d6
| 255072 ||  || — || October 27, 2005 || Ottmarsheim || C. Rinner || — || align=right | 3.4 km || 
|-id=073 bgcolor=#d6d6d6
| 255073 Victoriabond ||  ||  || October 30, 2005 || Côtes de Meuse || M. Dawson || KOR || align=right | 1.7 km || 
|-id=074 bgcolor=#d6d6d6
| 255074 ||  || — || October 22, 2005 || Catalina || CSS || — || align=right | 2.2 km || 
|-id=075 bgcolor=#d6d6d6
| 255075 ||  || — || October 22, 2005 || Kitt Peak || Spacewatch || — || align=right | 3.8 km || 
|-id=076 bgcolor=#d6d6d6
| 255076 ||  || — || October 22, 2005 || Kitt Peak || Spacewatch || — || align=right | 3.8 km || 
|-id=077 bgcolor=#d6d6d6
| 255077 ||  || — || October 22, 2005 || Kitt Peak || Spacewatch || EOS || align=right | 2.4 km || 
|-id=078 bgcolor=#d6d6d6
| 255078 ||  || — || October 23, 2005 || Kitt Peak || Spacewatch || — || align=right | 2.7 km || 
|-id=079 bgcolor=#d6d6d6
| 255079 ||  || — || October 23, 2005 || Catalina || CSS || — || align=right | 3.8 km || 
|-id=080 bgcolor=#d6d6d6
| 255080 ||  || — || October 24, 2005 || Kitt Peak || Spacewatch || — || align=right | 2.4 km || 
|-id=081 bgcolor=#d6d6d6
| 255081 ||  || — || October 24, 2005 || Kitt Peak || Spacewatch || — || align=right | 3.6 km || 
|-id=082 bgcolor=#d6d6d6
| 255082 ||  || — || October 24, 2005 || Kitt Peak || Spacewatch || — || align=right | 4.7 km || 
|-id=083 bgcolor=#d6d6d6
| 255083 ||  || — || October 24, 2005 || Kitt Peak || Spacewatch || THM || align=right | 2.6 km || 
|-id=084 bgcolor=#d6d6d6
| 255084 ||  || — || October 24, 2005 || Kitt Peak || Spacewatch || — || align=right | 3.8 km || 
|-id=085 bgcolor=#d6d6d6
| 255085 ||  || — || October 24, 2005 || Kitt Peak || Spacewatch || — || align=right | 3.8 km || 
|-id=086 bgcolor=#d6d6d6
| 255086 ||  || — || October 24, 2005 || Kitt Peak || Spacewatch || — || align=right | 2.7 km || 
|-id=087 bgcolor=#d6d6d6
| 255087 ||  || — || October 24, 2005 || Kitt Peak || Spacewatch || — || align=right | 4.6 km || 
|-id=088 bgcolor=#d6d6d6
| 255088 ||  || — || October 24, 2005 || Goodricke-Pigott || R. A. Tucker || — || align=right | 3.1 km || 
|-id=089 bgcolor=#d6d6d6
| 255089 ||  || — || October 22, 2005 || Kitt Peak || Spacewatch || — || align=right | 3.1 km || 
|-id=090 bgcolor=#d6d6d6
| 255090 ||  || — || October 22, 2005 || Kitt Peak || Spacewatch || — || align=right | 2.7 km || 
|-id=091 bgcolor=#d6d6d6
| 255091 ||  || — || October 22, 2005 || Kitt Peak || Spacewatch || — || align=right | 2.5 km || 
|-id=092 bgcolor=#FA8072
| 255092 ||  || — || October 22, 2005 || Catalina || CSS || H || align=right data-sort-value="0.74" | 740 m || 
|-id=093 bgcolor=#d6d6d6
| 255093 ||  || — || October 23, 2005 || Kitt Peak || Spacewatch || EOS || align=right | 2.8 km || 
|-id=094 bgcolor=#d6d6d6
| 255094 ||  || — || October 23, 2005 || Catalina || CSS || EMA || align=right | 4.1 km || 
|-id=095 bgcolor=#d6d6d6
| 255095 ||  || — || October 23, 2005 || Catalina || CSS || CHA || align=right | 3.4 km || 
|-id=096 bgcolor=#d6d6d6
| 255096 ||  || — || October 24, 2005 || Kitt Peak || Spacewatch || — || align=right | 3.9 km || 
|-id=097 bgcolor=#d6d6d6
| 255097 ||  || — || October 25, 2005 || Catalina || CSS || — || align=right | 4.3 km || 
|-id=098 bgcolor=#d6d6d6
| 255098 ||  || — || October 25, 2005 || Mount Lemmon || Mount Lemmon Survey || EOS || align=right | 3.5 km || 
|-id=099 bgcolor=#d6d6d6
| 255099 ||  || — || October 25, 2005 || Mount Lemmon || Mount Lemmon Survey || — || align=right | 2.7 km || 
|-id=100 bgcolor=#E9E9E9
| 255100 ||  || — || October 22, 2005 || Palomar || NEAT || HNS || align=right | 2.2 km || 
|}

255101–255200 

|-bgcolor=#d6d6d6
| 255101 ||  || — || October 22, 2005 || Catalina || CSS || — || align=right | 4.5 km || 
|-id=102 bgcolor=#d6d6d6
| 255102 ||  || — || October 22, 2005 || Catalina || CSS || — || align=right | 3.1 km || 
|-id=103 bgcolor=#d6d6d6
| 255103 ||  || — || October 22, 2005 || Palomar || NEAT || — || align=right | 4.4 km || 
|-id=104 bgcolor=#d6d6d6
| 255104 ||  || — || October 22, 2005 || Palomar || NEAT || — || align=right | 2.7 km || 
|-id=105 bgcolor=#d6d6d6
| 255105 ||  || — || October 23, 2005 || Catalina || CSS || — || align=right | 3.8 km || 
|-id=106 bgcolor=#d6d6d6
| 255106 ||  || — || October 23, 2005 || Catalina || CSS || EOS || align=right | 2.9 km || 
|-id=107 bgcolor=#d6d6d6
| 255107 ||  || — || October 23, 2005 || Palomar || NEAT || — || align=right | 2.9 km || 
|-id=108 bgcolor=#d6d6d6
| 255108 ||  || — || October 22, 2005 || Kitt Peak || Spacewatch || KOR || align=right | 1.6 km || 
|-id=109 bgcolor=#d6d6d6
| 255109 ||  || — || October 22, 2005 || Kitt Peak || Spacewatch || KAR || align=right | 1.5 km || 
|-id=110 bgcolor=#d6d6d6
| 255110 ||  || — || October 22, 2005 || Kitt Peak || Spacewatch || — || align=right | 4.5 km || 
|-id=111 bgcolor=#d6d6d6
| 255111 ||  || — || October 22, 2005 || Kitt Peak || Spacewatch || — || align=right | 3.3 km || 
|-id=112 bgcolor=#d6d6d6
| 255112 ||  || — || October 22, 2005 || Kitt Peak || Spacewatch || — || align=right | 2.8 km || 
|-id=113 bgcolor=#d6d6d6
| 255113 ||  || — || October 22, 2005 || Kitt Peak || Spacewatch || CHA || align=right | 2.6 km || 
|-id=114 bgcolor=#d6d6d6
| 255114 ||  || — || October 22, 2005 || Kitt Peak || Spacewatch || EOS || align=right | 2.6 km || 
|-id=115 bgcolor=#d6d6d6
| 255115 ||  || — || October 22, 2005 || Kitt Peak || Spacewatch || — || align=right | 2.4 km || 
|-id=116 bgcolor=#d6d6d6
| 255116 ||  || — || October 22, 2005 || Kitt Peak || Spacewatch || — || align=right | 3.0 km || 
|-id=117 bgcolor=#E9E9E9
| 255117 ||  || — || October 22, 2005 || Catalina || CSS || — || align=right | 4.1 km || 
|-id=118 bgcolor=#d6d6d6
| 255118 ||  || — || October 22, 2005 || Kitt Peak || Spacewatch || KOR || align=right | 1.8 km || 
|-id=119 bgcolor=#d6d6d6
| 255119 ||  || — || October 22, 2005 || Palomar || NEAT || — || align=right | 3.2 km || 
|-id=120 bgcolor=#d6d6d6
| 255120 ||  || — || October 22, 2005 || Kitt Peak || Spacewatch || — || align=right | 3.3 km || 
|-id=121 bgcolor=#d6d6d6
| 255121 ||  || — || October 22, 2005 || Kitt Peak || Spacewatch || THM || align=right | 2.8 km || 
|-id=122 bgcolor=#d6d6d6
| 255122 ||  || — || October 22, 2005 || Kitt Peak || Spacewatch || — || align=right | 2.8 km || 
|-id=123 bgcolor=#d6d6d6
| 255123 ||  || — || October 23, 2005 || Palomar || NEAT || HYG || align=right | 4.2 km || 
|-id=124 bgcolor=#d6d6d6
| 255124 ||  || — || October 24, 2005 || Kitt Peak || Spacewatch || LIX || align=right | 5.0 km || 
|-id=125 bgcolor=#d6d6d6
| 255125 ||  || — || October 24, 2005 || Kitt Peak || Spacewatch || KOR || align=right | 1.7 km || 
|-id=126 bgcolor=#d6d6d6
| 255126 ||  || — || October 24, 2005 || Kitt Peak || Spacewatch || KOR || align=right | 2.0 km || 
|-id=127 bgcolor=#d6d6d6
| 255127 ||  || — || October 24, 2005 || Kitt Peak || Spacewatch || — || align=right | 3.7 km || 
|-id=128 bgcolor=#d6d6d6
| 255128 ||  || — || October 24, 2005 || Kitt Peak || Spacewatch || — || align=right | 3.7 km || 
|-id=129 bgcolor=#d6d6d6
| 255129 ||  || — || October 24, 2005 || Palomar || NEAT || — || align=right | 1.7 km || 
|-id=130 bgcolor=#E9E9E9
| 255130 ||  || — || October 24, 2005 || Palomar || NEAT || INO || align=right | 1.4 km || 
|-id=131 bgcolor=#d6d6d6
| 255131 ||  || — || October 24, 2005 || Palomar || NEAT || — || align=right | 4.0 km || 
|-id=132 bgcolor=#d6d6d6
| 255132 ||  || — || October 24, 2005 || Kitt Peak || Spacewatch || — || align=right | 6.3 km || 
|-id=133 bgcolor=#d6d6d6
| 255133 ||  || — || October 24, 2005 || Palomar || NEAT || — || align=right | 3.9 km || 
|-id=134 bgcolor=#d6d6d6
| 255134 ||  || — || October 25, 2005 || Mount Lemmon || Mount Lemmon Survey || — || align=right | 3.4 km || 
|-id=135 bgcolor=#d6d6d6
| 255135 ||  || — || October 25, 2005 || Kitt Peak || Spacewatch || URS || align=right | 5.6 km || 
|-id=136 bgcolor=#d6d6d6
| 255136 ||  || — || October 25, 2005 || Catalina || CSS || — || align=right | 4.2 km || 
|-id=137 bgcolor=#d6d6d6
| 255137 ||  || — || October 25, 2005 || Catalina || CSS || 615 || align=right | 2.3 km || 
|-id=138 bgcolor=#d6d6d6
| 255138 ||  || — || October 25, 2005 || Catalina || CSS || — || align=right | 3.5 km || 
|-id=139 bgcolor=#d6d6d6
| 255139 ||  || — || October 25, 2005 || Mount Lemmon || Mount Lemmon Survey || KOR || align=right | 1.9 km || 
|-id=140 bgcolor=#d6d6d6
| 255140 ||  || — || October 26, 2005 || Kitt Peak || Spacewatch || EOS || align=right | 2.9 km || 
|-id=141 bgcolor=#d6d6d6
| 255141 ||  || — || October 26, 2005 || Kitt Peak || Spacewatch || — || align=right | 2.9 km || 
|-id=142 bgcolor=#d6d6d6
| 255142 ||  || — || October 26, 2005 || Anderson Mesa || LONEOS || — || align=right | 4.0 km || 
|-id=143 bgcolor=#d6d6d6
| 255143 ||  || — || October 26, 2005 || Kitt Peak || Spacewatch || KOR || align=right | 2.0 km || 
|-id=144 bgcolor=#d6d6d6
| 255144 ||  || — || October 26, 2005 || Kitt Peak || Spacewatch || — || align=right | 3.1 km || 
|-id=145 bgcolor=#d6d6d6
| 255145 ||  || — || October 25, 2005 || Catalina || CSS || — || align=right | 4.1 km || 
|-id=146 bgcolor=#d6d6d6
| 255146 ||  || — || October 24, 2005 || Kitt Peak || Spacewatch || — || align=right | 2.9 km || 
|-id=147 bgcolor=#E9E9E9
| 255147 ||  || — || October 24, 2005 || Kitt Peak || Spacewatch || — || align=right | 2.4 km || 
|-id=148 bgcolor=#d6d6d6
| 255148 ||  || — || October 24, 2005 || Kitt Peak || Spacewatch || — || align=right | 3.4 km || 
|-id=149 bgcolor=#d6d6d6
| 255149 ||  || — || October 24, 2005 || Kitt Peak || Spacewatch || EOS || align=right | 2.6 km || 
|-id=150 bgcolor=#d6d6d6
| 255150 ||  || — || October 24, 2005 || Kitt Peak || Spacewatch || — || align=right | 2.4 km || 
|-id=151 bgcolor=#d6d6d6
| 255151 ||  || — || October 24, 2005 || Kitt Peak || Spacewatch || HYG || align=right | 3.4 km || 
|-id=152 bgcolor=#d6d6d6
| 255152 ||  || — || October 24, 2005 || Kitt Peak || Spacewatch || — || align=right | 3.4 km || 
|-id=153 bgcolor=#d6d6d6
| 255153 ||  || — || October 24, 2005 || Kitt Peak || Spacewatch || — || align=right | 3.3 km || 
|-id=154 bgcolor=#d6d6d6
| 255154 ||  || — || October 24, 2005 || Kitt Peak || Spacewatch || THM || align=right | 2.6 km || 
|-id=155 bgcolor=#d6d6d6
| 255155 ||  || — || October 24, 2005 || Kitt Peak || Spacewatch || KOR || align=right | 1.8 km || 
|-id=156 bgcolor=#d6d6d6
| 255156 ||  || — || October 24, 2005 || Kitt Peak || Spacewatch || — || align=right | 3.4 km || 
|-id=157 bgcolor=#d6d6d6
| 255157 ||  || — || October 25, 2005 || Mount Lemmon || Mount Lemmon Survey || — || align=right | 3.4 km || 
|-id=158 bgcolor=#d6d6d6
| 255158 ||  || — || October 25, 2005 || Mount Lemmon || Mount Lemmon Survey || HYG || align=right | 2.9 km || 
|-id=159 bgcolor=#d6d6d6
| 255159 ||  || — || October 25, 2005 || Mount Lemmon || Mount Lemmon Survey || — || align=right | 2.4 km || 
|-id=160 bgcolor=#d6d6d6
| 255160 ||  || — || October 25, 2005 || Mount Lemmon || Mount Lemmon Survey || — || align=right | 3.4 km || 
|-id=161 bgcolor=#d6d6d6
| 255161 ||  || — || October 27, 2005 || Mount Lemmon || Mount Lemmon Survey || — || align=right | 4.0 km || 
|-id=162 bgcolor=#d6d6d6
| 255162 ||  || — || October 27, 2005 || Mount Lemmon || Mount Lemmon Survey || THM || align=right | 2.6 km || 
|-id=163 bgcolor=#d6d6d6
| 255163 ||  || — || October 22, 2005 || Kitt Peak || Spacewatch || — || align=right | 2.9 km || 
|-id=164 bgcolor=#d6d6d6
| 255164 ||  || — || October 24, 2005 || Kitt Peak || Spacewatch || CHA || align=right | 2.8 km || 
|-id=165 bgcolor=#d6d6d6
| 255165 ||  || — || October 25, 2005 || Kitt Peak || Spacewatch || KOR || align=right | 1.6 km || 
|-id=166 bgcolor=#d6d6d6
| 255166 ||  || — || October 25, 2005 || Kitt Peak || Spacewatch || THM || align=right | 2.7 km || 
|-id=167 bgcolor=#d6d6d6
| 255167 ||  || — || October 25, 2005 || Kitt Peak || Spacewatch || — || align=right | 4.5 km || 
|-id=168 bgcolor=#d6d6d6
| 255168 ||  || — || October 26, 2005 || Kitt Peak || Spacewatch || — || align=right | 3.6 km || 
|-id=169 bgcolor=#d6d6d6
| 255169 ||  || — || October 27, 2005 || Kitt Peak || Spacewatch || HYG || align=right | 4.5 km || 
|-id=170 bgcolor=#d6d6d6
| 255170 ||  || — || October 28, 2005 || Socorro || LINEAR || — || align=right | 2.6 km || 
|-id=171 bgcolor=#d6d6d6
| 255171 ||  || — || October 22, 2005 || Kitt Peak || Spacewatch || HYG || align=right | 3.2 km || 
|-id=172 bgcolor=#d6d6d6
| 255172 ||  || — || October 25, 2005 || Kitt Peak || Spacewatch || — || align=right | 4.4 km || 
|-id=173 bgcolor=#E9E9E9
| 255173 ||  || — || October 25, 2005 || Kitt Peak || Spacewatch || — || align=right | 3.1 km || 
|-id=174 bgcolor=#d6d6d6
| 255174 ||  || — || October 25, 2005 || Kitt Peak || Spacewatch || EOS || align=right | 2.6 km || 
|-id=175 bgcolor=#d6d6d6
| 255175 ||  || — || October 25, 2005 || Mount Lemmon || Mount Lemmon Survey || THM || align=right | 2.5 km || 
|-id=176 bgcolor=#d6d6d6
| 255176 ||  || — || October 25, 2005 || Kitt Peak || Spacewatch || EOS || align=right | 2.1 km || 
|-id=177 bgcolor=#d6d6d6
| 255177 ||  || — || October 25, 2005 || Kitt Peak || Spacewatch || — || align=right | 6.1 km || 
|-id=178 bgcolor=#d6d6d6
| 255178 ||  || — || October 25, 2005 || Catalina || CSS || EOS || align=right | 2.5 km || 
|-id=179 bgcolor=#d6d6d6
| 255179 ||  || — || October 25, 2005 || Kitt Peak || Spacewatch || — || align=right | 4.8 km || 
|-id=180 bgcolor=#d6d6d6
| 255180 ||  || — || October 27, 2005 || Mount Lemmon || Mount Lemmon Survey || — || align=right | 3.0 km || 
|-id=181 bgcolor=#d6d6d6
| 255181 ||  || — || October 28, 2005 || Mount Lemmon || Mount Lemmon Survey || — || align=right | 2.9 km || 
|-id=182 bgcolor=#E9E9E9
| 255182 ||  || — || October 24, 2005 || Kitt Peak || Spacewatch || — || align=right | 2.5 km || 
|-id=183 bgcolor=#d6d6d6
| 255183 ||  || — || October 25, 2005 || Kitt Peak || Spacewatch || — || align=right | 2.5 km || 
|-id=184 bgcolor=#d6d6d6
| 255184 ||  || — || October 25, 2005 || Kitt Peak || Spacewatch || CHA || align=right | 2.3 km || 
|-id=185 bgcolor=#d6d6d6
| 255185 ||  || — || October 25, 2005 || Kitt Peak || Spacewatch || — || align=right | 2.8 km || 
|-id=186 bgcolor=#d6d6d6
| 255186 ||  || — || October 27, 2005 || Kitt Peak || Spacewatch || THM || align=right | 2.5 km || 
|-id=187 bgcolor=#d6d6d6
| 255187 ||  || — || October 24, 2005 || Kitt Peak || Spacewatch || MRC || align=right | 3.3 km || 
|-id=188 bgcolor=#d6d6d6
| 255188 ||  || — || October 26, 2005 || Kitt Peak || Spacewatch || EOS || align=right | 1.9 km || 
|-id=189 bgcolor=#d6d6d6
| 255189 ||  || — || October 26, 2005 || Kitt Peak || Spacewatch || EOS || align=right | 2.5 km || 
|-id=190 bgcolor=#d6d6d6
| 255190 ||  || — || October 26, 2005 || Kitt Peak || Spacewatch || — || align=right | 3.3 km || 
|-id=191 bgcolor=#d6d6d6
| 255191 ||  || — || October 26, 2005 || Kitt Peak || Spacewatch || — || align=right | 3.7 km || 
|-id=192 bgcolor=#d6d6d6
| 255192 ||  || — || October 26, 2005 || Kitt Peak || Spacewatch || THM || align=right | 3.9 km || 
|-id=193 bgcolor=#d6d6d6
| 255193 ||  || — || October 26, 2005 || Kitt Peak || Spacewatch || EOS || align=right | 2.5 km || 
|-id=194 bgcolor=#d6d6d6
| 255194 ||  || — || October 27, 2005 || Mount Lemmon || Mount Lemmon Survey || — || align=right | 3.5 km || 
|-id=195 bgcolor=#d6d6d6
| 255195 ||  || — || October 29, 2005 || Catalina || CSS || — || align=right | 3.3 km || 
|-id=196 bgcolor=#d6d6d6
| 255196 ||  || — || October 29, 2005 || Catalina || CSS || — || align=right | 3.5 km || 
|-id=197 bgcolor=#d6d6d6
| 255197 ||  || — || October 27, 2005 || Catalina || CSS || — || align=right | 4.3 km || 
|-id=198 bgcolor=#d6d6d6
| 255198 ||  || — || October 24, 2005 || Kitt Peak || Spacewatch || — || align=right | 3.1 km || 
|-id=199 bgcolor=#d6d6d6
| 255199 ||  || — || October 27, 2005 || Kitt Peak || Spacewatch || — || align=right | 3.8 km || 
|-id=200 bgcolor=#d6d6d6
| 255200 ||  || — || October 27, 2005 || Kitt Peak || Spacewatch || EOS || align=right | 2.3 km || 
|}

255201–255300 

|-bgcolor=#d6d6d6
| 255201 ||  || — || October 27, 2005 || Kitt Peak || Spacewatch || — || align=right | 2.9 km || 
|-id=202 bgcolor=#d6d6d6
| 255202 ||  || — || October 29, 2005 || Catalina || CSS || EOS || align=right | 2.9 km || 
|-id=203 bgcolor=#d6d6d6
| 255203 ||  || — || October 28, 2005 || Mount Lemmon || Mount Lemmon Survey || KOR || align=right | 1.6 km || 
|-id=204 bgcolor=#d6d6d6
| 255204 ||  || — || October 28, 2005 || Mount Lemmon || Mount Lemmon Survey || EOS || align=right | 2.6 km || 
|-id=205 bgcolor=#d6d6d6
| 255205 ||  || — || October 31, 2005 || Kitt Peak || Spacewatch || — || align=right | 3.4 km || 
|-id=206 bgcolor=#d6d6d6
| 255206 ||  || — || October 31, 2005 || Kitt Peak || Spacewatch || EOS || align=right | 1.9 km || 
|-id=207 bgcolor=#d6d6d6
| 255207 ||  || — || October 31, 2005 || Socorro || LINEAR || — || align=right | 3.6 km || 
|-id=208 bgcolor=#d6d6d6
| 255208 ||  || — || October 31, 2005 || Catalina || CSS || — || align=right | 4.6 km || 
|-id=209 bgcolor=#E9E9E9
| 255209 ||  || — || October 25, 2005 || Kitt Peak || Spacewatch || — || align=right | 3.9 km || 
|-id=210 bgcolor=#d6d6d6
| 255210 ||  || — || October 29, 2005 || Catalina || CSS || — || align=right | 3.1 km || 
|-id=211 bgcolor=#d6d6d6
| 255211 ||  || — || October 29, 2005 || Catalina || CSS || — || align=right | 3.5 km || 
|-id=212 bgcolor=#d6d6d6
| 255212 ||  || — || October 29, 2005 || Catalina || CSS || — || align=right | 3.1 km || 
|-id=213 bgcolor=#d6d6d6
| 255213 ||  || — || October 29, 2005 || Catalina || CSS || — || align=right | 4.8 km || 
|-id=214 bgcolor=#d6d6d6
| 255214 ||  || — || October 29, 2005 || Catalina || CSS || — || align=right | 5.0 km || 
|-id=215 bgcolor=#d6d6d6
| 255215 ||  || — || October 29, 2005 || Catalina || CSS || — || align=right | 4.0 km || 
|-id=216 bgcolor=#d6d6d6
| 255216 ||  || — || October 30, 2005 || Catalina || CSS || — || align=right | 2.7 km || 
|-id=217 bgcolor=#E9E9E9
| 255217 ||  || — || October 25, 2005 || Mount Lemmon || Mount Lemmon Survey || AGN || align=right | 1.6 km || 
|-id=218 bgcolor=#E9E9E9
| 255218 ||  || — || October 29, 2005 || Mount Lemmon || Mount Lemmon Survey || — || align=right | 2.8 km || 
|-id=219 bgcolor=#d6d6d6
| 255219 ||  || — || October 27, 2005 || Kitt Peak || Spacewatch || — || align=right | 3.7 km || 
|-id=220 bgcolor=#d6d6d6
| 255220 ||  || — || October 30, 2005 || Kitt Peak || Spacewatch || — || align=right | 2.5 km || 
|-id=221 bgcolor=#d6d6d6
| 255221 ||  || — || October 30, 2005 || Mount Lemmon || Mount Lemmon Survey || KOR || align=right | 1.4 km || 
|-id=222 bgcolor=#d6d6d6
| 255222 ||  || — || October 29, 2005 || Catalina || CSS || 628 || align=right | 2.2 km || 
|-id=223 bgcolor=#d6d6d6
| 255223 ||  || — || October 30, 2005 || Socorro || LINEAR || — || align=right | 4.3 km || 
|-id=224 bgcolor=#d6d6d6
| 255224 ||  || — || October 30, 2005 || Mount Lemmon || Mount Lemmon Survey || EOS || align=right | 5.4 km || 
|-id=225 bgcolor=#d6d6d6
| 255225 ||  || — || October 31, 2005 || Mount Lemmon || Mount Lemmon Survey || — || align=right | 3.3 km || 
|-id=226 bgcolor=#d6d6d6
| 255226 ||  || — || October 31, 2005 || Mount Lemmon || Mount Lemmon Survey || — || align=right | 4.1 km || 
|-id=227 bgcolor=#d6d6d6
| 255227 ||  || — || October 25, 2005 || Mount Lemmon || Mount Lemmon Survey || — || align=right | 4.4 km || 
|-id=228 bgcolor=#d6d6d6
| 255228 ||  || — || October 27, 2005 || Mount Lemmon || Mount Lemmon Survey || — || align=right | 3.1 km || 
|-id=229 bgcolor=#d6d6d6
| 255229 ||  || — || October 28, 2005 || Kitt Peak || Spacewatch || — || align=right | 2.6 km || 
|-id=230 bgcolor=#d6d6d6
| 255230 ||  || — || October 28, 2005 || Kitt Peak || Spacewatch || EOS || align=right | 4.1 km || 
|-id=231 bgcolor=#d6d6d6
| 255231 ||  || — || October 27, 2005 || Kitt Peak || Spacewatch || — || align=right | 3.3 km || 
|-id=232 bgcolor=#d6d6d6
| 255232 ||  || — || October 27, 2005 || Mount Lemmon || Mount Lemmon Survey || — || align=right | 4.2 km || 
|-id=233 bgcolor=#E9E9E9
| 255233 ||  || — || October 28, 2005 || Mount Lemmon || Mount Lemmon Survey || AGN || align=right | 1.4 km || 
|-id=234 bgcolor=#E9E9E9
| 255234 ||  || — || October 29, 2005 || Catalina || CSS || — || align=right | 2.5 km || 
|-id=235 bgcolor=#d6d6d6
| 255235 ||  || — || October 29, 2005 || Catalina || CSS || EOS || align=right | 2.3 km || 
|-id=236 bgcolor=#d6d6d6
| 255236 ||  || — || October 29, 2005 || Catalina || CSS || — || align=right | 3.9 km || 
|-id=237 bgcolor=#d6d6d6
| 255237 ||  || — || October 30, 2005 || Socorro || LINEAR || — || align=right | 3.6 km || 
|-id=238 bgcolor=#d6d6d6
| 255238 ||  || — || October 31, 2005 || Kitt Peak || Spacewatch || — || align=right | 3.0 km || 
|-id=239 bgcolor=#d6d6d6
| 255239 ||  || — || October 29, 2005 || Catalina || CSS || — || align=right | 4.3 km || 
|-id=240 bgcolor=#d6d6d6
| 255240 ||  || — || October 29, 2005 || Catalina || CSS || — || align=right | 5.0 km || 
|-id=241 bgcolor=#d6d6d6
| 255241 ||  || — || October 27, 2005 || Mount Lemmon || Mount Lemmon Survey || — || align=right | 2.9 km || 
|-id=242 bgcolor=#d6d6d6
| 255242 ||  || — || October 28, 2005 || Mount Lemmon || Mount Lemmon Survey || — || align=right | 3.3 km || 
|-id=243 bgcolor=#d6d6d6
| 255243 ||  || — || October 22, 2005 || Catalina || CSS || VER || align=right | 4.5 km || 
|-id=244 bgcolor=#d6d6d6
| 255244 ||  || — || October 22, 2005 || Catalina || CSS || TIR || align=right | 3.9 km || 
|-id=245 bgcolor=#d6d6d6
| 255245 ||  || — || October 26, 2005 || Anderson Mesa || LONEOS || — || align=right | 4.5 km || 
|-id=246 bgcolor=#E9E9E9
| 255246 ||  || — || October 27, 2005 || Socorro || LINEAR || — || align=right | 3.0 km || 
|-id=247 bgcolor=#d6d6d6
| 255247 ||  || — || October 27, 2005 || Anderson Mesa || LONEOS || EOS || align=right | 3.4 km || 
|-id=248 bgcolor=#d6d6d6
| 255248 ||  || — || October 22, 2005 || Kitt Peak || Spacewatch || — || align=right | 3.4 km || 
|-id=249 bgcolor=#d6d6d6
| 255249 ||  || — || October 25, 2005 || Mount Lemmon || Mount Lemmon Survey || 7:4 || align=right | 3.9 km || 
|-id=250 bgcolor=#d6d6d6
| 255250 ||  || — || October 25, 2005 || Mount Lemmon || Mount Lemmon Survey || KOR || align=right | 1.6 km || 
|-id=251 bgcolor=#d6d6d6
| 255251 ||  || — || October 28, 2005 || Kitt Peak || Spacewatch || — || align=right | 2.0 km || 
|-id=252 bgcolor=#d6d6d6
| 255252 ||  || — || October 28, 2005 || Mount Lemmon || Mount Lemmon Survey || — || align=right | 2.7 km || 
|-id=253 bgcolor=#d6d6d6
| 255253 ||  || — || October 26, 2005 || Apache Point || A. C. Becker || TEL || align=right | 1.9 km || 
|-id=254 bgcolor=#E9E9E9
| 255254 ||  || — || October 27, 2005 || Apache Point || A. C. Becker || AGN || align=right | 1.6 km || 
|-id=255 bgcolor=#d6d6d6
| 255255 ||  || — || October 24, 2005 || Kitt Peak || Spacewatch || — || align=right | 3.0 km || 
|-id=256 bgcolor=#fefefe
| 255256 ||  || — || November 2, 2005 || Socorro || LINEAR || H || align=right data-sort-value="0.70" | 700 m || 
|-id=257 bgcolor=#d6d6d6
| 255257 Mechwart ||  ||  || November 4, 2005 || Piszkéstető || K. Sárneczky || — || align=right | 4.4 km || 
|-id=258 bgcolor=#d6d6d6
| 255258 ||  || — || November 6, 2005 || Mayhill || A. Lowe || — || align=right | 3.7 km || 
|-id=259 bgcolor=#d6d6d6
| 255259 ||  || — || November 6, 2005 || Kitt Peak || Spacewatch || — || align=right | 3.9 km || 
|-id=260 bgcolor=#d6d6d6
| 255260 ||  || — || November 6, 2005 || Mount Lemmon || Mount Lemmon Survey || — || align=right | 3.5 km || 
|-id=261 bgcolor=#d6d6d6
| 255261 ||  || — || November 9, 2005 || Piszkéstető || K. Sárneczky || — || align=right | 3.8 km || 
|-id=262 bgcolor=#d6d6d6
| 255262 ||  || — || November 2, 2005 || Socorro || LINEAR || — || align=right | 4.4 km || 
|-id=263 bgcolor=#E9E9E9
| 255263 ||  || — || November 3, 2005 || Kitt Peak || Spacewatch || AGN || align=right | 1.6 km || 
|-id=264 bgcolor=#d6d6d6
| 255264 ||  || — || November 4, 2005 || Kitt Peak || Spacewatch || — || align=right | 2.9 km || 
|-id=265 bgcolor=#d6d6d6
| 255265 ||  || — || November 4, 2005 || Mount Lemmon || Mount Lemmon Survey || — || align=right | 3.3 km || 
|-id=266 bgcolor=#E9E9E9
| 255266 ||  || — || November 3, 2005 || Catalina || CSS || — || align=right | 3.4 km || 
|-id=267 bgcolor=#d6d6d6
| 255267 ||  || — || November 5, 2005 || Kitt Peak || Spacewatch || EOS || align=right | 1.9 km || 
|-id=268 bgcolor=#d6d6d6
| 255268 ||  || — || November 1, 2005 || Socorro || LINEAR || — || align=right | 4.5 km || 
|-id=269 bgcolor=#d6d6d6
| 255269 ||  || — || November 1, 2005 || Kitt Peak || Spacewatch || EOS || align=right | 3.2 km || 
|-id=270 bgcolor=#d6d6d6
| 255270 ||  || — || November 2, 2005 || Socorro || LINEAR || EUP || align=right | 6.0 km || 
|-id=271 bgcolor=#d6d6d6
| 255271 ||  || — || November 3, 2005 || Catalina || CSS || — || align=right | 2.4 km || 
|-id=272 bgcolor=#d6d6d6
| 255272 ||  || — || November 3, 2005 || Mount Lemmon || Mount Lemmon Survey || — || align=right | 3.7 km || 
|-id=273 bgcolor=#d6d6d6
| 255273 ||  || — || November 3, 2005 || Mount Lemmon || Mount Lemmon Survey || EOS || align=right | 2.8 km || 
|-id=274 bgcolor=#d6d6d6
| 255274 ||  || — || November 3, 2005 || Mount Lemmon || Mount Lemmon Survey || — || align=right | 5.6 km || 
|-id=275 bgcolor=#d6d6d6
| 255275 ||  || — || November 4, 2005 || Mount Lemmon || Mount Lemmon Survey || — || align=right | 4.7 km || 
|-id=276 bgcolor=#d6d6d6
| 255276 ||  || — || November 5, 2005 || Mount Lemmon || Mount Lemmon Survey || — || align=right | 2.9 km || 
|-id=277 bgcolor=#d6d6d6
| 255277 ||  || — || November 5, 2005 || Catalina || CSS || — || align=right | 3.6 km || 
|-id=278 bgcolor=#E9E9E9
| 255278 ||  || — || November 1, 2005 || Mount Lemmon || Mount Lemmon Survey || AGN || align=right | 1.4 km || 
|-id=279 bgcolor=#d6d6d6
| 255279 ||  || — || November 1, 2005 || Mount Lemmon || Mount Lemmon Survey || — || align=right | 3.2 km || 
|-id=280 bgcolor=#d6d6d6
| 255280 ||  || — || November 1, 2005 || Mount Lemmon || Mount Lemmon Survey || — || align=right | 2.9 km || 
|-id=281 bgcolor=#d6d6d6
| 255281 ||  || — || November 1, 2005 || Mount Lemmon || Mount Lemmon Survey || — || align=right | 3.1 km || 
|-id=282 bgcolor=#d6d6d6
| 255282 ||  || — || November 3, 2005 || Kitt Peak || Spacewatch || — || align=right | 4.5 km || 
|-id=283 bgcolor=#d6d6d6
| 255283 ||  || — || November 4, 2005 || Catalina || CSS || TIR || align=right | 4.2 km || 
|-id=284 bgcolor=#d6d6d6
| 255284 ||  || — || November 5, 2005 || Kitt Peak || Spacewatch || — || align=right | 3.1 km || 
|-id=285 bgcolor=#d6d6d6
| 255285 ||  || — || November 6, 2005 || Kitt Peak || Spacewatch || — || align=right | 4.4 km || 
|-id=286 bgcolor=#d6d6d6
| 255286 ||  || — || November 6, 2005 || Socorro || LINEAR || EOS || align=right | 3.6 km || 
|-id=287 bgcolor=#d6d6d6
| 255287 ||  || — || November 6, 2005 || Kitt Peak || Spacewatch || — || align=right | 5.6 km || 
|-id=288 bgcolor=#d6d6d6
| 255288 ||  || — || November 4, 2005 || Mount Lemmon || Mount Lemmon Survey || — || align=right | 4.3 km || 
|-id=289 bgcolor=#d6d6d6
| 255289 ||  || — || November 6, 2005 || Kitt Peak || Spacewatch || — || align=right | 5.7 km || 
|-id=290 bgcolor=#d6d6d6
| 255290 ||  || — || November 10, 2005 || Catalina || CSS || TIR || align=right | 4.0 km || 
|-id=291 bgcolor=#d6d6d6
| 255291 ||  || — || November 1, 2005 || Kitt Peak || Spacewatch || — || align=right | 3.6 km || 
|-id=292 bgcolor=#d6d6d6
| 255292 ||  || — || November 5, 2005 || Kitt Peak || Spacewatch || — || align=right | 3.2 km || 
|-id=293 bgcolor=#d6d6d6
| 255293 ||  || — || November 6, 2005 || Mount Lemmon || Mount Lemmon Survey || — || align=right | 2.7 km || 
|-id=294 bgcolor=#d6d6d6
| 255294 ||  || — || November 9, 2005 || Campo Imperatore || CINEOS || HYG || align=right | 2.9 km || 
|-id=295 bgcolor=#d6d6d6
| 255295 ||  || — || November 10, 2005 || Kitt Peak || Spacewatch || — || align=right | 3.4 km || 
|-id=296 bgcolor=#d6d6d6
| 255296 ||  || — || November 11, 2005 || Kitt Peak || Spacewatch || — || align=right | 4.7 km || 
|-id=297 bgcolor=#d6d6d6
| 255297 ||  || — || November 12, 2005 || Kitt Peak || Spacewatch || — || align=right | 4.3 km || 
|-id=298 bgcolor=#d6d6d6
| 255298 ||  || — || November 2, 2005 || Socorro || LINEAR || — || align=right | 4.4 km || 
|-id=299 bgcolor=#d6d6d6
| 255299 ||  || — || November 5, 2005 || Anderson Mesa || LONEOS || — || align=right | 5.9 km || 
|-id=300 bgcolor=#d6d6d6
| 255300 ||  || — || November 10, 2005 || Catalina || CSS || — || align=right | 3.7 km || 
|}

255301–255400 

|-bgcolor=#d6d6d6
| 255301 ||  || — || November 12, 2005 || Catalina || CSS || IMH || align=right | 4.5 km || 
|-id=302 bgcolor=#E9E9E9
| 255302 ||  || — || November 10, 2005 || Catalina || CSS || — || align=right | 7.4 km || 
|-id=303 bgcolor=#d6d6d6
| 255303 ||  || — || November 2, 2005 || Catalina || CSS || — || align=right | 5.1 km || 
|-id=304 bgcolor=#E9E9E9
| 255304 ||  || — || November 1, 2005 || Apache Point || A. C. Becker || AGN || align=right | 1.4 km || 
|-id=305 bgcolor=#d6d6d6
| 255305 ||  || — || November 1, 2005 || Apache Point || A. C. Becker || — || align=right | 4.3 km || 
|-id=306 bgcolor=#d6d6d6
| 255306 ||  || — || November 1, 2005 || Apache Point || A. C. Becker || URS || align=right | 3.5 km || 
|-id=307 bgcolor=#d6d6d6
| 255307 || 2005 WR || — || November 20, 2005 || Wrightwood || J. W. Young || — || align=right | 3.2 km || 
|-id=308 bgcolor=#d6d6d6
| 255308 Christianzuber ||  ||  || November 20, 2005 || Nogales || J.-C. Merlin || — || align=right | 2.6 km || 
|-id=309 bgcolor=#d6d6d6
| 255309 ||  || — || November 21, 2005 || Kitt Peak || Spacewatch || THM || align=right | 2.4 km || 
|-id=310 bgcolor=#d6d6d6
| 255310 ||  || — || November 22, 2005 || Kitt Peak || Spacewatch || HYG || align=right | 2.6 km || 
|-id=311 bgcolor=#d6d6d6
| 255311 ||  || — || November 22, 2005 || Kitt Peak || Spacewatch || KOR || align=right | 1.6 km || 
|-id=312 bgcolor=#d6d6d6
| 255312 ||  || — || November 22, 2005 || Kitt Peak || Spacewatch || TEL || align=right | 2.6 km || 
|-id=313 bgcolor=#d6d6d6
| 255313 ||  || — || November 24, 2005 || Palomar || NEAT || EOS || align=right | 3.2 km || 
|-id=314 bgcolor=#E9E9E9
| 255314 ||  || — || November 24, 2005 || Palomar || NEAT || — || align=right | 3.9 km || 
|-id=315 bgcolor=#d6d6d6
| 255315 ||  || — || November 21, 2005 || Kitt Peak || Spacewatch || — || align=right | 4.8 km || 
|-id=316 bgcolor=#d6d6d6
| 255316 ||  || — || November 21, 2005 || Kitt Peak || Spacewatch || — || align=right | 3.5 km || 
|-id=317 bgcolor=#d6d6d6
| 255317 ||  || — || November 21, 2005 || Kitt Peak || Spacewatch || — || align=right | 3.4 km || 
|-id=318 bgcolor=#d6d6d6
| 255318 ||  || — || November 21, 2005 || Kitt Peak || Spacewatch || — || align=right | 3.6 km || 
|-id=319 bgcolor=#d6d6d6
| 255319 ||  || — || November 21, 2005 || Kitt Peak || Spacewatch || — || align=right | 3.3 km || 
|-id=320 bgcolor=#d6d6d6
| 255320 ||  || — || November 21, 2005 || Kitt Peak || Spacewatch || — || align=right | 3.5 km || 
|-id=321 bgcolor=#d6d6d6
| 255321 ||  || — || November 21, 2005 || Kitt Peak || Spacewatch || EOS || align=right | 3.0 km || 
|-id=322 bgcolor=#d6d6d6
| 255322 ||  || — || November 21, 2005 || Kitt Peak || Spacewatch || — || align=right | 4.3 km || 
|-id=323 bgcolor=#d6d6d6
| 255323 ||  || — || November 21, 2005 || Kitt Peak || Spacewatch || HYG || align=right | 5.5 km || 
|-id=324 bgcolor=#d6d6d6
| 255324 ||  || — || November 21, 2005 || Kitt Peak || Spacewatch || EMA || align=right | 5.5 km || 
|-id=325 bgcolor=#d6d6d6
| 255325 ||  || — || November 21, 2005 || Kitt Peak || Spacewatch || — || align=right | 3.7 km || 
|-id=326 bgcolor=#d6d6d6
| 255326 ||  || — || November 21, 2005 || Kitt Peak || Spacewatch || — || align=right | 4.0 km || 
|-id=327 bgcolor=#d6d6d6
| 255327 ||  || — || November 21, 2005 || Junk Bond || D. Healy || — || align=right | 3.5 km || 
|-id=328 bgcolor=#d6d6d6
| 255328 ||  || — || November 22, 2005 || Kitt Peak || Spacewatch || HYG || align=right | 3.1 km || 
|-id=329 bgcolor=#d6d6d6
| 255329 ||  || — || November 22, 2005 || Kitt Peak || Spacewatch || — || align=right | 2.5 km || 
|-id=330 bgcolor=#d6d6d6
| 255330 ||  || — || November 19, 2005 || Palomar || NEAT || — || align=right | 5.2 km || 
|-id=331 bgcolor=#d6d6d6
| 255331 ||  || — || November 20, 2005 || Palomar || NEAT || — || align=right | 3.3 km || 
|-id=332 bgcolor=#d6d6d6
| 255332 ||  || — || November 21, 2005 || Kitt Peak || Spacewatch || VER || align=right | 4.7 km || 
|-id=333 bgcolor=#d6d6d6
| 255333 ||  || — || November 22, 2005 || Kitt Peak || Spacewatch || — || align=right | 3.3 km || 
|-id=334 bgcolor=#d6d6d6
| 255334 ||  || — || November 22, 2005 || Kitt Peak || Spacewatch || — || align=right | 2.8 km || 
|-id=335 bgcolor=#d6d6d6
| 255335 ||  || — || November 25, 2005 || Mount Lemmon || Mount Lemmon Survey || KOR || align=right | 1.6 km || 
|-id=336 bgcolor=#d6d6d6
| 255336 ||  || — || November 25, 2005 || Mount Lemmon || Mount Lemmon Survey || KAR || align=right | 1.4 km || 
|-id=337 bgcolor=#d6d6d6
| 255337 ||  || — || November 26, 2005 || Junk Bond || D. Healy || BRA || align=right | 1.9 km || 
|-id=338 bgcolor=#fefefe
| 255338 ||  || — || November 30, 2005 || Socorro || LINEAR || H || align=right data-sort-value="0.84" | 840 m || 
|-id=339 bgcolor=#d6d6d6
| 255339 ||  || — || November 21, 2005 || Catalina || CSS || — || align=right | 2.9 km || 
|-id=340 bgcolor=#d6d6d6
| 255340 ||  || — || November 25, 2005 || Mount Lemmon || Mount Lemmon Survey || HYG || align=right | 3.6 km || 
|-id=341 bgcolor=#d6d6d6
| 255341 ||  || — || November 25, 2005 || Kitt Peak || Spacewatch || — || align=right | 4.6 km || 
|-id=342 bgcolor=#d6d6d6
| 255342 ||  || — || November 25, 2005 || Palomar || NEAT || — || align=right | 4.7 km || 
|-id=343 bgcolor=#d6d6d6
| 255343 ||  || — || November 22, 2005 || Kitt Peak || Spacewatch || — || align=right | 3.8 km || 
|-id=344 bgcolor=#d6d6d6
| 255344 ||  || — || November 22, 2005 || Kitt Peak || Spacewatch || — || align=right | 3.1 km || 
|-id=345 bgcolor=#d6d6d6
| 255345 ||  || — || November 22, 2005 || Kitt Peak || Spacewatch || — || align=right | 5.1 km || 
|-id=346 bgcolor=#d6d6d6
| 255346 ||  || — || November 21, 2005 || Catalina || CSS || — || align=right | 3.2 km || 
|-id=347 bgcolor=#d6d6d6
| 255347 ||  || — || November 25, 2005 || Kitt Peak || Spacewatch || — || align=right | 5.6 km || 
|-id=348 bgcolor=#d6d6d6
| 255348 ||  || — || November 25, 2005 || Kitt Peak || Spacewatch || — || align=right | 3.5 km || 
|-id=349 bgcolor=#d6d6d6
| 255349 ||  || — || November 25, 2005 || Kitt Peak || Spacewatch || — || align=right | 3.7 km || 
|-id=350 bgcolor=#d6d6d6
| 255350 ||  || — || November 28, 2005 || Socorro || LINEAR || — || align=right | 5.0 km || 
|-id=351 bgcolor=#d6d6d6
| 255351 ||  || — || November 26, 2005 || Mount Lemmon || Mount Lemmon Survey || — || align=right | 3.3 km || 
|-id=352 bgcolor=#d6d6d6
| 255352 ||  || — || November 26, 2005 || Mount Lemmon || Mount Lemmon Survey || — || align=right | 3.7 km || 
|-id=353 bgcolor=#fefefe
| 255353 ||  || — || November 28, 2005 || Mount Lemmon || Mount Lemmon Survey || H || align=right data-sort-value="0.80" | 800 m || 
|-id=354 bgcolor=#d6d6d6
| 255354 ||  || — || November 26, 2005 || Mount Lemmon || Mount Lemmon Survey || — || align=right | 5.1 km || 
|-id=355 bgcolor=#d6d6d6
| 255355 ||  || — || November 25, 2005 || Mount Lemmon || Mount Lemmon Survey || — || align=right | 2.5 km || 
|-id=356 bgcolor=#d6d6d6
| 255356 ||  || — || November 26, 2005 || Kitt Peak || Spacewatch || THM || align=right | 3.0 km || 
|-id=357 bgcolor=#d6d6d6
| 255357 ||  || — || November 26, 2005 || Kitt Peak || Spacewatch || — || align=right | 2.5 km || 
|-id=358 bgcolor=#d6d6d6
| 255358 ||  || — || November 26, 2005 || Mount Lemmon || Mount Lemmon Survey || — || align=right | 4.2 km || 
|-id=359 bgcolor=#d6d6d6
| 255359 ||  || — || November 26, 2005 || Kitt Peak || Spacewatch || THM || align=right | 2.6 km || 
|-id=360 bgcolor=#d6d6d6
| 255360 ||  || — || November 28, 2005 || Mount Lemmon || Mount Lemmon Survey || — || align=right | 4.2 km || 
|-id=361 bgcolor=#d6d6d6
| 255361 ||  || — || November 28, 2005 || Catalina || CSS || THM || align=right | 2.7 km || 
|-id=362 bgcolor=#d6d6d6
| 255362 ||  || — || November 25, 2005 || Catalina || CSS || EOS || align=right | 2.3 km || 
|-id=363 bgcolor=#d6d6d6
| 255363 ||  || — || November 28, 2005 || Catalina || CSS || — || align=right | 3.6 km || 
|-id=364 bgcolor=#E9E9E9
| 255364 ||  || — || November 29, 2005 || Catalina || CSS || TIN || align=right | 1.6 km || 
|-id=365 bgcolor=#d6d6d6
| 255365 ||  || — || November 29, 2005 || Catalina || CSS || TIR || align=right | 4.5 km || 
|-id=366 bgcolor=#d6d6d6
| 255366 ||  || — || November 29, 2005 || Catalina || CSS || — || align=right | 3.6 km || 
|-id=367 bgcolor=#d6d6d6
| 255367 ||  || — || November 25, 2005 || Mount Lemmon || Mount Lemmon Survey || — || align=right | 2.5 km || 
|-id=368 bgcolor=#d6d6d6
| 255368 ||  || — || November 28, 2005 || Catalina || CSS || — || align=right | 3.6 km || 
|-id=369 bgcolor=#d6d6d6
| 255369 ||  || — || November 30, 2005 || Kitt Peak || Spacewatch || — || align=right | 3.2 km || 
|-id=370 bgcolor=#d6d6d6
| 255370 ||  || — || November 30, 2005 || Socorro || LINEAR || — || align=right | 5.3 km || 
|-id=371 bgcolor=#d6d6d6
| 255371 ||  || — || November 30, 2005 || Socorro || LINEAR || EOS || align=right | 2.7 km || 
|-id=372 bgcolor=#d6d6d6
| 255372 ||  || — || November 28, 2005 || Kitt Peak || Spacewatch || — || align=right | 3.5 km || 
|-id=373 bgcolor=#d6d6d6
| 255373 ||  || — || November 29, 2005 || Mount Lemmon || Mount Lemmon Survey || — || align=right | 3.1 km || 
|-id=374 bgcolor=#d6d6d6
| 255374 ||  || — || November 30, 2005 || Socorro || LINEAR || — || align=right | 4.3 km || 
|-id=375 bgcolor=#d6d6d6
| 255375 ||  || — || November 30, 2005 || Socorro || LINEAR || — || align=right | 3.5 km || 
|-id=376 bgcolor=#d6d6d6
| 255376 ||  || — || November 28, 2005 || Socorro || LINEAR || — || align=right | 3.7 km || 
|-id=377 bgcolor=#d6d6d6
| 255377 ||  || — || November 28, 2005 || Catalina || CSS || HYG || align=right | 3.0 km || 
|-id=378 bgcolor=#E9E9E9
| 255378 ||  || — || November 25, 2005 || Mount Lemmon || Mount Lemmon Survey || AGN || align=right | 1.5 km || 
|-id=379 bgcolor=#d6d6d6
| 255379 ||  || — || November 25, 2005 || Mount Lemmon || Mount Lemmon Survey || THM || align=right | 2.7 km || 
|-id=380 bgcolor=#d6d6d6
| 255380 ||  || — || November 26, 2005 || Mount Lemmon || Mount Lemmon Survey || — || align=right | 3.3 km || 
|-id=381 bgcolor=#d6d6d6
| 255381 ||  || — || November 26, 2005 || Mount Lemmon || Mount Lemmon Survey || — || align=right | 3.2 km || 
|-id=382 bgcolor=#d6d6d6
| 255382 ||  || — || November 26, 2005 || Mount Lemmon || Mount Lemmon Survey || — || align=right | 4.6 km || 
|-id=383 bgcolor=#d6d6d6
| 255383 ||  || — || November 29, 2005 || Kitt Peak || Spacewatch || 7:4* || align=right | 3.6 km || 
|-id=384 bgcolor=#d6d6d6
| 255384 ||  || — || November 25, 2005 || Catalina || CSS || — || align=right | 4.3 km || 
|-id=385 bgcolor=#d6d6d6
| 255385 ||  || — || November 28, 2005 || Socorro || LINEAR || — || align=right | 4.0 km || 
|-id=386 bgcolor=#d6d6d6
| 255386 ||  || — || November 28, 2005 || Socorro || LINEAR || — || align=right | 5.1 km || 
|-id=387 bgcolor=#d6d6d6
| 255387 ||  || — || November 29, 2005 || Kitt Peak || Spacewatch || — || align=right | 3.7 km || 
|-id=388 bgcolor=#d6d6d6
| 255388 ||  || — || November 29, 2005 || Palomar || NEAT || EOS || align=right | 3.1 km || 
|-id=389 bgcolor=#fefefe
| 255389 ||  || — || November 28, 2005 || Socorro || LINEAR || H || align=right data-sort-value="0.99" | 990 m || 
|-id=390 bgcolor=#d6d6d6
| 255390 ||  || — || November 28, 2005 || Mount Lemmon || Mount Lemmon Survey || — || align=right | 5.5 km || 
|-id=391 bgcolor=#d6d6d6
| 255391 ||  || — || November 29, 2005 || Catalina || CSS || — || align=right | 3.4 km || 
|-id=392 bgcolor=#d6d6d6
| 255392 ||  || — || November 28, 2005 || Kitt Peak || Spacewatch || — || align=right | 4.0 km || 
|-id=393 bgcolor=#d6d6d6
| 255393 ||  || — || November 29, 2005 || Kitt Peak || Spacewatch || — || align=right | 4.8 km || 
|-id=394 bgcolor=#d6d6d6
| 255394 ||  || — || November 29, 2005 || Mount Lemmon || Mount Lemmon Survey || — || align=right | 3.3 km || 
|-id=395 bgcolor=#d6d6d6
| 255395 ||  || — || November 29, 2005 || Mount Lemmon || Mount Lemmon Survey || THM || align=right | 2.5 km || 
|-id=396 bgcolor=#d6d6d6
| 255396 ||  || — || November 29, 2005 || Mount Lemmon || Mount Lemmon Survey || — || align=right | 2.3 km || 
|-id=397 bgcolor=#d6d6d6
| 255397 ||  || — || November 21, 2005 || Catalina || CSS || — || align=right | 4.2 km || 
|-id=398 bgcolor=#d6d6d6
| 255398 ||  || — || November 25, 2005 || Catalina || CSS || — || align=right | 4.5 km || 
|-id=399 bgcolor=#d6d6d6
| 255399 ||  || — || November 29, 2005 || Catalina || CSS || — || align=right | 3.4 km || 
|-id=400 bgcolor=#d6d6d6
| 255400 ||  || — || November 30, 2005 || Socorro || LINEAR || LUT || align=right | 7.6 km || 
|}

255401–255500 

|-bgcolor=#d6d6d6
| 255401 ||  || — || November 30, 2005 || Catalina || CSS || — || align=right | 2.4 km || 
|-id=402 bgcolor=#d6d6d6
| 255402 ||  || — || November 30, 2005 || Socorro || LINEAR || EOS || align=right | 3.2 km || 
|-id=403 bgcolor=#d6d6d6
| 255403 ||  || — || November 19, 2005 || Palomar || NEAT || — || align=right | 4.1 km || 
|-id=404 bgcolor=#d6d6d6
| 255404 ||  || — || November 21, 2005 || Catalina || CSS || EOS || align=right | 3.3 km || 
|-id=405 bgcolor=#E9E9E9
| 255405 ||  || — || November 22, 2005 || Kitt Peak || Spacewatch || AGN || align=right | 1.8 km || 
|-id=406 bgcolor=#d6d6d6
| 255406 ||  || — || November 26, 2005 || Kitt Peak || Spacewatch || — || align=right | 4.8 km || 
|-id=407 bgcolor=#d6d6d6
| 255407 ||  || — || November 28, 2005 || Kitt Peak || Spacewatch || HYG || align=right | 3.2 km || 
|-id=408 bgcolor=#d6d6d6
| 255408 ||  || — || December 1, 2005 || Kitt Peak || Spacewatch || — || align=right | 3.8 km || 
|-id=409 bgcolor=#d6d6d6
| 255409 ||  || — || December 6, 2005 || Mayhill || A. Lowe || — || align=right | 4.6 km || 
|-id=410 bgcolor=#d6d6d6
| 255410 ||  || — || December 1, 2005 || Kitt Peak || Spacewatch || LIX || align=right | 5.8 km || 
|-id=411 bgcolor=#E9E9E9
| 255411 ||  || — || December 1, 2005 || Mount Lemmon || Mount Lemmon Survey || AGN || align=right | 1.4 km || 
|-id=412 bgcolor=#d6d6d6
| 255412 ||  || — || December 1, 2005 || Socorro || LINEAR || — || align=right | 3.9 km || 
|-id=413 bgcolor=#d6d6d6
| 255413 ||  || — || December 1, 2005 || Kitt Peak || Spacewatch || — || align=right | 2.8 km || 
|-id=414 bgcolor=#E9E9E9
| 255414 ||  || — || December 2, 2005 || Mount Lemmon || Mount Lemmon Survey || — || align=right | 3.0 km || 
|-id=415 bgcolor=#d6d6d6
| 255415 ||  || — || December 2, 2005 || Mount Lemmon || Mount Lemmon Survey || — || align=right | 3.5 km || 
|-id=416 bgcolor=#d6d6d6
| 255416 ||  || — || December 2, 2005 || Socorro || LINEAR || — || align=right | 3.6 km || 
|-id=417 bgcolor=#d6d6d6
| 255417 ||  || — || December 4, 2005 || Socorro || LINEAR || — || align=right | 5.1 km || 
|-id=418 bgcolor=#d6d6d6
| 255418 ||  || — || December 4, 2005 || Kitt Peak || Spacewatch || URS || align=right | 5.4 km || 
|-id=419 bgcolor=#d6d6d6
| 255419 ||  || — || December 2, 2005 || Kitt Peak || Spacewatch || — || align=right | 3.8 km || 
|-id=420 bgcolor=#d6d6d6
| 255420 ||  || — || December 5, 2005 || Socorro || LINEAR || — || align=right | 3.8 km || 
|-id=421 bgcolor=#d6d6d6
| 255421 ||  || — || December 6, 2005 || Kitt Peak || Spacewatch || EUP || align=right | 7.1 km || 
|-id=422 bgcolor=#d6d6d6
| 255422 ||  || — || December 2, 2005 || Mount Lemmon || Mount Lemmon Survey || THM || align=right | 3.2 km || 
|-id=423 bgcolor=#d6d6d6
| 255423 ||  || — || December 4, 2005 || Kitt Peak || Spacewatch || THM || align=right | 3.3 km || 
|-id=424 bgcolor=#d6d6d6
| 255424 ||  || — || December 4, 2005 || Kitt Peak || Spacewatch || — || align=right | 2.8 km || 
|-id=425 bgcolor=#d6d6d6
| 255425 ||  || — || December 6, 2005 || Kitt Peak || Spacewatch || — || align=right | 4.1 km || 
|-id=426 bgcolor=#d6d6d6
| 255426 ||  || — || December 6, 2005 || Kitt Peak || Spacewatch || — || align=right | 4.6 km || 
|-id=427 bgcolor=#d6d6d6
| 255427 ||  || — || December 6, 2005 || Kitt Peak || Spacewatch || — || align=right | 5.2 km || 
|-id=428 bgcolor=#d6d6d6
| 255428 ||  || — || December 6, 2005 || Kitt Peak || Spacewatch || — || align=right | 3.8 km || 
|-id=429 bgcolor=#fefefe
| 255429 ||  || — || December 7, 2005 || Kitt Peak || Spacewatch || — || align=right | 1.3 km || 
|-id=430 bgcolor=#d6d6d6
| 255430 ||  || — || December 8, 2005 || Kitt Peak || Spacewatch || KOR || align=right | 1.6 km || 
|-id=431 bgcolor=#d6d6d6
| 255431 ||  || — || December 4, 2005 || Catalina || CSS || AEG || align=right | 4.8 km || 
|-id=432 bgcolor=#d6d6d6
| 255432 ||  || — || December 8, 2005 || Catalina || CSS || — || align=right | 4.9 km || 
|-id=433 bgcolor=#d6d6d6
| 255433 ||  || — || December 8, 2005 || Kitt Peak || Spacewatch || — || align=right | 2.5 km || 
|-id=434 bgcolor=#d6d6d6
| 255434 ||  || — || December 8, 2005 || Kitt Peak || Spacewatch || — || align=right | 4.7 km || 
|-id=435 bgcolor=#d6d6d6
| 255435 ||  || — || December 10, 2005 || Kitt Peak || Spacewatch || — || align=right | 3.1 km || 
|-id=436 bgcolor=#d6d6d6
| 255436 ||  || — || December 5, 2005 || Socorro || LINEAR || — || align=right | 5.7 km || 
|-id=437 bgcolor=#d6d6d6
| 255437 ||  || — || December 8, 2005 || Socorro || LINEAR || — || align=right | 3.5 km || 
|-id=438 bgcolor=#d6d6d6
| 255438 ||  || — || December 10, 2005 || Kitt Peak || Spacewatch || HYG || align=right | 3.1 km || 
|-id=439 bgcolor=#d6d6d6
| 255439 ||  || — || December 8, 2005 || Kitt Peak || Spacewatch || THM || align=right | 3.0 km || 
|-id=440 bgcolor=#d6d6d6
| 255440 ||  || — || December 21, 2005 || Catalina || CSS || THB || align=right | 5.0 km || 
|-id=441 bgcolor=#fefefe
| 255441 ||  || — || December 23, 2005 || Socorro || LINEAR || H || align=right data-sort-value="0.82" | 820 m || 
|-id=442 bgcolor=#d6d6d6
| 255442 ||  || — || December 21, 2005 || Kitt Peak || Spacewatch || — || align=right | 6.0 km || 
|-id=443 bgcolor=#d6d6d6
| 255443 ||  || — || December 22, 2005 || Kitt Peak || Spacewatch || — || align=right | 5.2 km || 
|-id=444 bgcolor=#d6d6d6
| 255444 ||  || — || December 22, 2005 || Kitt Peak || Spacewatch || HYG || align=right | 3.7 km || 
|-id=445 bgcolor=#d6d6d6
| 255445 ||  || — || December 24, 2005 || Kitt Peak || Spacewatch || — || align=right | 2.7 km || 
|-id=446 bgcolor=#d6d6d6
| 255446 ||  || — || December 24, 2005 || Kitt Peak || Spacewatch || THM || align=right | 2.6 km || 
|-id=447 bgcolor=#d6d6d6
| 255447 ||  || — || December 24, 2005 || Kitt Peak || Spacewatch || THM || align=right | 2.8 km || 
|-id=448 bgcolor=#d6d6d6
| 255448 ||  || — || December 24, 2005 || Kitt Peak || Spacewatch || THM || align=right | 3.2 km || 
|-id=449 bgcolor=#d6d6d6
| 255449 ||  || — || December 21, 2005 || Kitt Peak || Spacewatch || — || align=right | 3.6 km || 
|-id=450 bgcolor=#d6d6d6
| 255450 ||  || — || December 25, 2005 || Kitt Peak || Spacewatch || — || align=right | 4.5 km || 
|-id=451 bgcolor=#d6d6d6
| 255451 ||  || — || December 25, 2005 || Kitt Peak || Spacewatch || — || align=right | 4.3 km || 
|-id=452 bgcolor=#d6d6d6
| 255452 ||  || — || December 21, 2005 || Catalina || CSS || — || align=right | 5.1 km || 
|-id=453 bgcolor=#d6d6d6
| 255453 ||  || — || December 24, 2005 || Kitt Peak || Spacewatch || THM || align=right | 2.7 km || 
|-id=454 bgcolor=#d6d6d6
| 255454 ||  || — || December 26, 2005 || Kitt Peak || Spacewatch || — || align=right | 3.9 km || 
|-id=455 bgcolor=#d6d6d6
| 255455 ||  || — || December 25, 2005 || Kitt Peak || Spacewatch || — || align=right | 2.9 km || 
|-id=456 bgcolor=#fefefe
| 255456 ||  || — || December 22, 2005 || Catalina || CSS || H || align=right | 1.1 km || 
|-id=457 bgcolor=#d6d6d6
| 255457 ||  || — || December 25, 2005 || Kitt Peak || Spacewatch || — || align=right | 3.4 km || 
|-id=458 bgcolor=#d6d6d6
| 255458 ||  || — || December 24, 2005 || Kitt Peak || Spacewatch || — || align=right | 4.4 km || 
|-id=459 bgcolor=#d6d6d6
| 255459 ||  || — || December 24, 2005 || Kitt Peak || Spacewatch || 7:4 || align=right | 6.9 km || 
|-id=460 bgcolor=#d6d6d6
| 255460 ||  || — || December 24, 2005 || Kitt Peak || Spacewatch || THM || align=right | 2.9 km || 
|-id=461 bgcolor=#d6d6d6
| 255461 ||  || — || December 24, 2005 || Kitt Peak || Spacewatch || THM || align=right | 1.9 km || 
|-id=462 bgcolor=#d6d6d6
| 255462 ||  || — || December 24, 2005 || Kitt Peak || Spacewatch || THM || align=right | 3.5 km || 
|-id=463 bgcolor=#d6d6d6
| 255463 ||  || — || December 24, 2005 || Kitt Peak || Spacewatch || — || align=right | 2.6 km || 
|-id=464 bgcolor=#d6d6d6
| 255464 ||  || — || December 25, 2005 || Mount Lemmon || Mount Lemmon Survey || 7:4 || align=right | 2.9 km || 
|-id=465 bgcolor=#d6d6d6
| 255465 ||  || — || December 25, 2005 || Mount Lemmon || Mount Lemmon Survey || HYG || align=right | 3.2 km || 
|-id=466 bgcolor=#d6d6d6
| 255466 ||  || — || December 27, 2005 || Kitt Peak || Spacewatch || — || align=right | 3.5 km || 
|-id=467 bgcolor=#d6d6d6
| 255467 ||  || — || December 25, 2005 || Kitt Peak || Spacewatch || — || align=right | 2.8 km || 
|-id=468 bgcolor=#d6d6d6
| 255468 ||  || — || December 25, 2005 || Mount Lemmon || Mount Lemmon Survey || HYG || align=right | 4.4 km || 
|-id=469 bgcolor=#d6d6d6
| 255469 ||  || — || December 28, 2005 || Mount Lemmon || Mount Lemmon Survey || THM || align=right | 3.5 km || 
|-id=470 bgcolor=#d6d6d6
| 255470 ||  || — || December 24, 2005 || Palomar || NEAT || LIX || align=right | 6.3 km || 
|-id=471 bgcolor=#d6d6d6
| 255471 ||  || — || December 28, 2005 || Socorro || LINEAR || — || align=right | 4.6 km || 
|-id=472 bgcolor=#d6d6d6
| 255472 ||  || — || December 28, 2005 || Mount Lemmon || Mount Lemmon Survey || — || align=right | 4.3 km || 
|-id=473 bgcolor=#d6d6d6
| 255473 ||  || — || December 27, 2005 || Kitt Peak || Spacewatch || — || align=right | 5.6 km || 
|-id=474 bgcolor=#d6d6d6
| 255474 ||  || — || December 30, 2005 || Socorro || LINEAR || EOS || align=right | 3.8 km || 
|-id=475 bgcolor=#d6d6d6
| 255475 ||  || — || December 30, 2005 || Socorro || LINEAR || TIR || align=right | 3.2 km || 
|-id=476 bgcolor=#d6d6d6
| 255476 ||  || — || December 27, 2005 || Kitt Peak || Spacewatch || — || align=right | 2.2 km || 
|-id=477 bgcolor=#d6d6d6
| 255477 ||  || — || December 30, 2005 || Socorro || LINEAR || — || align=right | 4.3 km || 
|-id=478 bgcolor=#d6d6d6
| 255478 ||  || — || December 24, 2005 || Socorro || LINEAR || — || align=right | 5.7 km || 
|-id=479 bgcolor=#d6d6d6
| 255479 ||  || — || December 27, 2005 || Kitt Peak || Spacewatch || HYG || align=right | 4.2 km || 
|-id=480 bgcolor=#d6d6d6
| 255480 ||  || — || December 22, 2005 || Catalina || CSS || TIR || align=right | 3.8 km || 
|-id=481 bgcolor=#fefefe
| 255481 ||  || — || December 30, 2005 || Catalina || CSS || H || align=right | 1.2 km || 
|-id=482 bgcolor=#d6d6d6
| 255482 ||  || — || December 30, 2005 || Catalina || CSS || — || align=right | 4.5 km || 
|-id=483 bgcolor=#d6d6d6
| 255483 ||  || — || December 21, 2005 || Kitt Peak || Spacewatch || — || align=right | 3.2 km || 
|-id=484 bgcolor=#d6d6d6
| 255484 ||  || — || December 28, 2005 || Kitt Peak || Spacewatch || — || align=right | 2.9 km || 
|-id=485 bgcolor=#d6d6d6
| 255485 ||  || — || December 28, 2005 || Mount Lemmon || Mount Lemmon Survey || — || align=right | 4.1 km || 
|-id=486 bgcolor=#d6d6d6
| 255486 ||  || — || December 21, 2005 || Kitt Peak || Spacewatch || — || align=right | 3.4 km || 
|-id=487 bgcolor=#d6d6d6
| 255487 ||  || — || January 2, 2006 || Catalina || CSS || — || align=right | 5.9 km || 
|-id=488 bgcolor=#d6d6d6
| 255488 ||  || — || January 5, 2006 || Socorro || LINEAR || EOS || align=right | 2.9 km || 
|-id=489 bgcolor=#d6d6d6
| 255489 ||  || — || January 5, 2006 || Catalina || CSS || EUP || align=right | 6.5 km || 
|-id=490 bgcolor=#E9E9E9
| 255490 ||  || — || January 7, 2006 || Anderson Mesa || LONEOS || — || align=right | 3.4 km || 
|-id=491 bgcolor=#fefefe
| 255491 ||  || — || January 5, 2006 || Catalina || CSS || — || align=right | 1.0 km || 
|-id=492 bgcolor=#d6d6d6
| 255492 ||  || — || January 6, 2006 || Kitt Peak || Spacewatch || — || align=right | 2.7 km || 
|-id=493 bgcolor=#d6d6d6
| 255493 ||  || — || January 6, 2006 || Catalina || CSS || — || align=right | 4.7 km || 
|-id=494 bgcolor=#d6d6d6
| 255494 ||  || — || January 4, 2006 || Kitt Peak || Spacewatch || — || align=right | 4.0 km || 
|-id=495 bgcolor=#d6d6d6
| 255495 ||  || — || January 6, 2006 || Kitt Peak || Spacewatch || — || align=right | 6.4 km || 
|-id=496 bgcolor=#d6d6d6
| 255496 ||  || — || January 2, 2006 || Socorro || LINEAR || — || align=right | 4.6 km || 
|-id=497 bgcolor=#d6d6d6
| 255497 ||  || — || January 5, 2006 || Catalina || CSS || EOS || align=right | 2.8 km || 
|-id=498 bgcolor=#d6d6d6
| 255498 ||  || — || January 10, 2006 || Catalina || CSS || — || align=right | 5.8 km || 
|-id=499 bgcolor=#d6d6d6
| 255499 ||  || — || January 2, 2006 || Catalina || CSS || — || align=right | 4.8 km || 
|-id=500 bgcolor=#fefefe
| 255500 ||  || — || January 7, 2006 || Catalina || CSS || H || align=right data-sort-value="0.76" | 760 m || 
|}

255501–255600 

|-bgcolor=#FFC2E0
| 255501 ||  || — || January 20, 2006 || Catalina || CSS || APO || align=right data-sort-value="0.64" | 640 m || 
|-id=502 bgcolor=#d6d6d6
| 255502 ||  || — || January 20, 2006 || Kitt Peak || Spacewatch || — || align=right | 3.7 km || 
|-id=503 bgcolor=#d6d6d6
| 255503 ||  || — || January 22, 2006 || Anderson Mesa || LONEOS || 7:4 || align=right | 4.3 km || 
|-id=504 bgcolor=#d6d6d6
| 255504 ||  || — || January 22, 2006 || Catalina || CSS || 7:4 || align=right | 6.5 km || 
|-id=505 bgcolor=#d6d6d6
| 255505 ||  || — || January 20, 2006 || Kitt Peak || Spacewatch || — || align=right | 3.5 km || 
|-id=506 bgcolor=#d6d6d6
| 255506 ||  || — || January 27, 2006 || Mayhill || R. Hutsebaut || — || align=right | 4.5 km || 
|-id=507 bgcolor=#d6d6d6
| 255507 ||  || — || January 23, 2006 || Kitt Peak || Spacewatch || — || align=right | 4.5 km || 
|-id=508 bgcolor=#d6d6d6
| 255508 ||  || — || January 24, 2006 || Socorro || LINEAR || — || align=right | 4.3 km || 
|-id=509 bgcolor=#fefefe
| 255509 ||  || — || January 26, 2006 || Kitt Peak || Spacewatch || FLO || align=right data-sort-value="0.77" | 770 m || 
|-id=510 bgcolor=#d6d6d6
| 255510 ||  || — || January 23, 2006 || Socorro || LINEAR || HYG || align=right | 4.4 km || 
|-id=511 bgcolor=#d6d6d6
| 255511 ||  || — || January 23, 2006 || Socorro || LINEAR || — || align=right | 5.2 km || 
|-id=512 bgcolor=#d6d6d6
| 255512 ||  || — || January 26, 2006 || Mount Lemmon || Mount Lemmon Survey || HYG || align=right | 3.5 km || 
|-id=513 bgcolor=#d6d6d6
| 255513 ||  || — || January 28, 2006 || Anderson Mesa || LONEOS || HYG || align=right | 3.8 km || 
|-id=514 bgcolor=#d6d6d6
| 255514 ||  || — || January 23, 2006 || Catalina || CSS || — || align=right | 3.7 km || 
|-id=515 bgcolor=#d6d6d6
| 255515 ||  || — || January 30, 2006 || Catalina || CSS || THB || align=right | 6.2 km || 
|-id=516 bgcolor=#d6d6d6
| 255516 ||  || — || January 31, 2006 || Kitt Peak || Spacewatch || 7:4 || align=right | 4.3 km || 
|-id=517 bgcolor=#d6d6d6
| 255517 ||  || — || January 26, 2006 || Catalina || CSS || HYG || align=right | 4.2 km || 
|-id=518 bgcolor=#fefefe
| 255518 ||  || — || February 2, 2006 || Kitt Peak || Spacewatch || — || align=right | 1.2 km || 
|-id=519 bgcolor=#d6d6d6
| 255519 ||  || — || February 3, 2006 || Anderson Mesa || LONEOS || — || align=right | 5.6 km || 
|-id=520 bgcolor=#fefefe
| 255520 ||  || — || February 6, 2006 || Mount Lemmon || Mount Lemmon Survey || — || align=right data-sort-value="0.79" | 790 m || 
|-id=521 bgcolor=#fefefe
| 255521 ||  || — || February 20, 2006 || Kitt Peak || Spacewatch || — || align=right data-sort-value="0.85" | 850 m || 
|-id=522 bgcolor=#d6d6d6
| 255522 ||  || — || February 20, 2006 || Catalina || CSS || — || align=right | 3.1 km || 
|-id=523 bgcolor=#d6d6d6
| 255523 ||  || — || February 20, 2006 || Socorro || LINEAR || — || align=right | 4.7 km || 
|-id=524 bgcolor=#fefefe
| 255524 ||  || — || February 20, 2006 || Kitt Peak || Spacewatch || FLO || align=right data-sort-value="0.85" | 850 m || 
|-id=525 bgcolor=#d6d6d6
| 255525 ||  || — || February 24, 2006 || Kitt Peak || Spacewatch || HIL3:2 || align=right | 8.3 km || 
|-id=526 bgcolor=#fefefe
| 255526 ||  || — || March 4, 2006 || Kitt Peak || Spacewatch || — || align=right data-sort-value="0.74" | 740 m || 
|-id=527 bgcolor=#FA8072
| 255527 ||  || — || March 2, 2006 || Kitt Peak || Spacewatch || — || align=right data-sort-value="0.48" | 480 m || 
|-id=528 bgcolor=#fefefe
| 255528 ||  || — || March 24, 2006 || Mount Lemmon || Mount Lemmon Survey || — || align=right data-sort-value="0.72" | 720 m || 
|-id=529 bgcolor=#d6d6d6
| 255529 ||  || — || March 25, 2006 || Catalina || CSS || Tj (2.94) || align=right | 5.2 km || 
|-id=530 bgcolor=#fefefe
| 255530 ||  || — || March 24, 2006 || Kitt Peak || Spacewatch || V || align=right | 1.0 km || 
|-id=531 bgcolor=#fefefe
| 255531 ||  || — || April 2, 2006 || Kitt Peak || Spacewatch || — || align=right | 1.2 km || 
|-id=532 bgcolor=#fefefe
| 255532 ||  || — || April 19, 2006 || Mount Lemmon || Mount Lemmon Survey || — || align=right data-sort-value="0.79" | 790 m || 
|-id=533 bgcolor=#fefefe
| 255533 ||  || — || April 20, 2006 || Kitt Peak || Spacewatch || — || align=right data-sort-value="0.95" | 950 m || 
|-id=534 bgcolor=#fefefe
| 255534 ||  || — || April 21, 2006 || Catalina || CSS || NYS || align=right data-sort-value="0.81" | 810 m || 
|-id=535 bgcolor=#FA8072
| 255535 ||  || — || April 19, 2006 || Catalina || CSS || — || align=right data-sort-value="0.95" | 950 m || 
|-id=536 bgcolor=#fefefe
| 255536 ||  || — || April 25, 2006 || Palomar || NEAT || — || align=right | 1.2 km || 
|-id=537 bgcolor=#fefefe
| 255537 ||  || — || April 24, 2006 || Kitt Peak || Spacewatch || FLO || align=right data-sort-value="0.65" | 650 m || 
|-id=538 bgcolor=#fefefe
| 255538 ||  || — || April 26, 2006 || Kitt Peak || Spacewatch || — || align=right | 1.5 km || 
|-id=539 bgcolor=#fefefe
| 255539 ||  || — || April 26, 2006 || Kitt Peak || Spacewatch || — || align=right | 1.1 km || 
|-id=540 bgcolor=#d6d6d6
| 255540 ||  || — || April 29, 2006 || Siding Spring || SSS || 7:4 || align=right | 6.9 km || 
|-id=541 bgcolor=#fefefe
| 255541 ||  || — || April 30, 2006 || Catalina || CSS || — || align=right data-sort-value="0.71" | 710 m || 
|-id=542 bgcolor=#fefefe
| 255542 ||  || — || April 30, 2006 || Kitt Peak || Spacewatch || — || align=right data-sort-value="0.59" | 590 m || 
|-id=543 bgcolor=#fefefe
| 255543 ||  || — || May 1, 2006 || Kitt Peak || Spacewatch || — || align=right data-sort-value="0.86" | 860 m || 
|-id=544 bgcolor=#fefefe
| 255544 ||  || — || May 1, 2006 || Kitt Peak || Spacewatch || — || align=right data-sort-value="0.65" | 650 m || 
|-id=545 bgcolor=#fefefe
| 255545 ||  || — || May 1, 2006 || Kitt Peak || Spacewatch || — || align=right data-sort-value="0.91" | 910 m || 
|-id=546 bgcolor=#fefefe
| 255546 ||  || — || May 4, 2006 || Mount Lemmon || Mount Lemmon Survey || — || align=right data-sort-value="0.89" | 890 m || 
|-id=547 bgcolor=#fefefe
| 255547 ||  || — || May 2, 2006 || Mount Lemmon || Mount Lemmon Survey || — || align=right | 1.00 km || 
|-id=548 bgcolor=#fefefe
| 255548 ||  || — || May 5, 2006 || Mount Lemmon || Mount Lemmon Survey || — || align=right data-sort-value="0.85" | 850 m || 
|-id=549 bgcolor=#fefefe
| 255549 ||  || — || May 5, 2006 || Mount Lemmon || Mount Lemmon Survey || NYS || align=right data-sort-value="0.77" | 770 m || 
|-id=550 bgcolor=#FA8072
| 255550 ||  || — || May 2, 2006 || Reedy Creek || J. Broughton || — || align=right data-sort-value="0.87" | 870 m || 
|-id=551 bgcolor=#fefefe
| 255551 ||  || — || May 3, 2006 || Kitt Peak || Spacewatch || FLO || align=right data-sort-value="0.58" | 580 m || 
|-id=552 bgcolor=#fefefe
| 255552 ||  || — || May 6, 2006 || Mount Lemmon || Mount Lemmon Survey || NYS || align=right data-sort-value="0.60" | 600 m || 
|-id=553 bgcolor=#fefefe
| 255553 ||  || — || May 7, 2006 || Kitt Peak || Spacewatch || CHL || align=right | 2.2 km || 
|-id=554 bgcolor=#fefefe
| 255554 ||  || — || May 5, 2006 || Mount Lemmon || Mount Lemmon Survey || — || align=right data-sort-value="0.87" | 870 m || 
|-id=555 bgcolor=#fefefe
| 255555 ||  || — || May 8, 2006 || Mount Lemmon || Mount Lemmon Survey || — || align=right data-sort-value="0.97" | 970 m || 
|-id=556 bgcolor=#fefefe
| 255556 ||  || — || May 19, 2006 || Catalina || CSS || — || align=right | 1.1 km || 
|-id=557 bgcolor=#E9E9E9
| 255557 ||  || — || May 19, 2006 || Palomar || NEAT || EUN || align=right | 1.4 km || 
|-id=558 bgcolor=#fefefe
| 255558 ||  || — || May 18, 2006 || Palomar || NEAT || FLO || align=right data-sort-value="0.74" | 740 m || 
|-id=559 bgcolor=#fefefe
| 255559 ||  || — || May 20, 2006 || Mount Lemmon || Mount Lemmon Survey || — || align=right data-sort-value="0.70" | 700 m || 
|-id=560 bgcolor=#fefefe
| 255560 ||  || — || May 20, 2006 || Kitt Peak || Spacewatch || FLO || align=right data-sort-value="0.83" | 830 m || 
|-id=561 bgcolor=#fefefe
| 255561 ||  || — || May 20, 2006 || Mount Lemmon || Mount Lemmon Survey || FLO || align=right data-sort-value="0.99" | 990 m || 
|-id=562 bgcolor=#d6d6d6
| 255562 ||  || — || May 20, 2006 || Siding Spring || SSS || EUP || align=right | 5.5 km || 
|-id=563 bgcolor=#fefefe
| 255563 ||  || — || May 21, 2006 || Kitt Peak || Spacewatch || — || align=right | 1.1 km || 
|-id=564 bgcolor=#fefefe
| 255564 ||  || — || May 21, 2006 || Kitt Peak || Spacewatch || NYS || align=right data-sort-value="0.74" | 740 m || 
|-id=565 bgcolor=#fefefe
| 255565 ||  || — || May 24, 2006 || Mount Lemmon || Mount Lemmon Survey || — || align=right | 1.2 km || 
|-id=566 bgcolor=#fefefe
| 255566 ||  || — || May 24, 2006 || Mount Lemmon || Mount Lemmon Survey || — || align=right | 1.1 km || 
|-id=567 bgcolor=#fefefe
| 255567 ||  || — || May 25, 2006 || Mount Lemmon || Mount Lemmon Survey || — || align=right data-sort-value="0.98" | 980 m || 
|-id=568 bgcolor=#fefefe
| 255568 ||  || — || May 19, 2006 || Mount Lemmon || Mount Lemmon Survey || — || align=right data-sort-value="0.86" | 860 m || 
|-id=569 bgcolor=#d6d6d6
| 255569 ||  || — || May 20, 2006 || Siding Spring || SSS || — || align=right | 5.4 km || 
|-id=570 bgcolor=#fefefe
| 255570 ||  || — || May 24, 2006 || Palomar || NEAT || — || align=right | 1.2 km || 
|-id=571 bgcolor=#fefefe
| 255571 ||  || — || May 24, 2006 || Mount Lemmon || Mount Lemmon Survey || — || align=right | 1.00 km || 
|-id=572 bgcolor=#fefefe
| 255572 ||  || — || May 31, 2006 || Mount Lemmon || Mount Lemmon Survey || — || align=right data-sort-value="0.82" | 820 m || 
|-id=573 bgcolor=#fefefe
| 255573 ||  || — || May 31, 2006 || Mount Lemmon || Mount Lemmon Survey || — || align=right data-sort-value="0.83" | 830 m || 
|-id=574 bgcolor=#fefefe
| 255574 ||  || — || May 31, 2006 || Mount Lemmon || Mount Lemmon Survey || — || align=right data-sort-value="0.62" | 620 m || 
|-id=575 bgcolor=#fefefe
| 255575 ||  || — || May 31, 2006 || Kitt Peak || Spacewatch || — || align=right data-sort-value="0.82" | 820 m || 
|-id=576 bgcolor=#fefefe
| 255576 ||  || — || May 19, 2006 || Anderson Mesa || LONEOS || FLO || align=right data-sort-value="0.74" | 740 m || 
|-id=577 bgcolor=#fefefe
| 255577 ||  || — || May 25, 2006 || Kitt Peak || Spacewatch || — || align=right | 1.7 km || 
|-id=578 bgcolor=#fefefe
| 255578 ||  || — || May 26, 2006 || Mount Lemmon || Mount Lemmon Survey || V || align=right data-sort-value="0.93" | 930 m || 
|-id=579 bgcolor=#fefefe
| 255579 ||  || — || June 5, 2006 || Socorro || LINEAR || FLO || align=right data-sort-value="0.81" | 810 m || 
|-id=580 bgcolor=#fefefe
| 255580 ||  || — || June 9, 2006 || Palomar || NEAT || — || align=right | 1.5 km || 
|-id=581 bgcolor=#fefefe
| 255581 ||  || — || June 15, 2006 || Lulin Observatory || Q.-z. Ye || — || align=right data-sort-value="0.67" | 670 m || 
|-id=582 bgcolor=#fefefe
| 255582 ||  || — || June 11, 2006 || Palomar || NEAT || — || align=right | 1.6 km || 
|-id=583 bgcolor=#fefefe
| 255583 ||  || — || June 19, 2006 || Mount Lemmon || Mount Lemmon Survey || — || align=right | 1.0 km || 
|-id=584 bgcolor=#E9E9E9
| 255584 ||  || — || June 19, 2006 || Mount Lemmon || Mount Lemmon Survey || — || align=right | 3.6 km || 
|-id=585 bgcolor=#fefefe
| 255585 ||  || — || July 8, 2006 || Siding Spring || SSS || FLO || align=right | 1.2 km || 
|-id=586 bgcolor=#fefefe
| 255586 ||  || — || July 17, 2006 || Reedy Creek || J. Broughton || — || align=right data-sort-value="0.89" | 890 m || 
|-id=587 bgcolor=#FA8072
| 255587 Gardenia ||  ||  || July 21, 2006 || Vallemare di Borbona || V. S. Casulli || — || align=right data-sort-value="0.86" | 860 m || 
|-id=588 bgcolor=#fefefe
| 255588 ||  || — || July 18, 2006 || Mayhill || iTelescope Obs. || V || align=right data-sort-value="0.85" | 850 m || 
|-id=589 bgcolor=#fefefe
| 255589 ||  || — || July 19, 2006 || Palomar || NEAT || FLO || align=right data-sort-value="0.80" | 800 m || 
|-id=590 bgcolor=#fefefe
| 255590 ||  || — || July 19, 2006 || Palomar || NEAT || NYS || align=right data-sort-value="0.80" | 800 m || 
|-id=591 bgcolor=#FA8072
| 255591 ||  || — || July 21, 2006 || Socorro || LINEAR || — || align=right | 1.1 km || 
|-id=592 bgcolor=#fefefe
| 255592 ||  || — || July 24, 2006 || Vicques || M. Ory || NYS || align=right data-sort-value="0.98" | 980 m || 
|-id=593 bgcolor=#fefefe
| 255593 ||  || — || July 26, 2006 || Hibiscus || S. F. Hönig || NYS || align=right data-sort-value="0.73" | 730 m || 
|-id=594 bgcolor=#fefefe
| 255594 ||  || — || July 25, 2006 || Palomar || NEAT || V || align=right data-sort-value="0.97" | 970 m || 
|-id=595 bgcolor=#fefefe
| 255595 ||  || — || July 26, 2006 || Reedy Creek || J. Broughton || — || align=right data-sort-value="0.91" | 910 m || 
|-id=596 bgcolor=#fefefe
| 255596 ||  || — || July 20, 2006 || Reedy Creek || J. Broughton || — || align=right | 1.0 km || 
|-id=597 bgcolor=#fefefe
| 255597 ||  || — || July 25, 2006 || Palomar || NEAT || MAS || align=right | 1.1 km || 
|-id=598 bgcolor=#fefefe
| 255598 Paullauterbur ||  ||  || August 13, 2006 || Vallemare Borbon || V. S. Casulli || — || align=right data-sort-value="0.90" | 900 m || 
|-id=599 bgcolor=#fefefe
| 255599 ||  || — || August 12, 2006 || Palomar || NEAT || — || align=right | 1.1 km || 
|-id=600 bgcolor=#fefefe
| 255600 ||  || — || August 15, 2006 || Reedy Creek || J. Broughton || ERI || align=right | 2.1 km || 
|}

255601–255700 

|-bgcolor=#E9E9E9
| 255601 ||  || — || August 15, 2006 || Reedy Creek || J. Broughton || — || align=right | 2.2 km || 
|-id=602 bgcolor=#fefefe
| 255602 ||  || — || August 12, 2006 || Palomar || NEAT || — || align=right | 1.0 km || 
|-id=603 bgcolor=#fefefe
| 255603 ||  || — || August 12, 2006 || Lulin Observatory || H.-C. Lin, Q.-z. Ye || — || align=right data-sort-value="0.94" | 940 m || 
|-id=604 bgcolor=#fefefe
| 255604 ||  || — || August 13, 2006 || Palomar || NEAT || — || align=right | 1.5 km || 
|-id=605 bgcolor=#fefefe
| 255605 ||  || — || August 13, 2006 || Palomar || NEAT || — || align=right data-sort-value="0.72" | 720 m || 
|-id=606 bgcolor=#fefefe
| 255606 ||  || — || August 13, 2006 || Palomar || NEAT || — || align=right | 1.7 km || 
|-id=607 bgcolor=#fefefe
| 255607 ||  || — || August 14, 2006 || Siding Spring || SSS || — || align=right data-sort-value="0.91" | 910 m || 
|-id=608 bgcolor=#fefefe
| 255608 ||  || — || August 14, 2006 || Siding Spring || SSS || V || align=right data-sort-value="0.80" | 800 m || 
|-id=609 bgcolor=#fefefe
| 255609 ||  || — || August 15, 2006 || Palomar || NEAT || NYS || align=right data-sort-value="0.98" | 980 m || 
|-id=610 bgcolor=#fefefe
| 255610 ||  || — || August 15, 2006 || Palomar || NEAT || — || align=right | 1.2 km || 
|-id=611 bgcolor=#fefefe
| 255611 ||  || — || August 15, 2006 || Palomar || NEAT || — || align=right data-sort-value="0.91" | 910 m || 
|-id=612 bgcolor=#fefefe
| 255612 ||  || — || August 15, 2006 || Palomar || NEAT || MAS || align=right data-sort-value="0.94" | 940 m || 
|-id=613 bgcolor=#fefefe
| 255613 ||  || — || August 15, 2006 || Palomar || NEAT || — || align=right | 1.4 km || 
|-id=614 bgcolor=#fefefe
| 255614 ||  || — || August 15, 2006 || Palomar || NEAT || FLO || align=right | 1.1 km || 
|-id=615 bgcolor=#fefefe
| 255615 ||  || — || August 13, 2006 || Palomar || NEAT || MAS || align=right data-sort-value="0.89" | 890 m || 
|-id=616 bgcolor=#fefefe
| 255616 ||  || — || August 13, 2006 || Palomar || NEAT || — || align=right data-sort-value="0.80" | 800 m || 
|-id=617 bgcolor=#fefefe
| 255617 ||  || — || August 15, 2006 || Palomar || NEAT || MAS || align=right data-sort-value="0.84" | 840 m || 
|-id=618 bgcolor=#fefefe
| 255618 ||  || — || August 15, 2006 || Palomar || NEAT || — || align=right data-sort-value="0.98" | 980 m || 
|-id=619 bgcolor=#fefefe
| 255619 ||  || — || August 15, 2006 || Palomar || NEAT || — || align=right | 1.2 km || 
|-id=620 bgcolor=#fefefe
| 255620 ||  || — || August 15, 2006 || Palomar || NEAT || MAS || align=right data-sort-value="0.88" | 880 m || 
|-id=621 bgcolor=#fefefe
| 255621 ||  || — || August 15, 2006 || Palomar || NEAT || — || align=right | 1.0 km || 
|-id=622 bgcolor=#fefefe
| 255622 ||  || — || August 13, 2006 || Palomar || NEAT || — || align=right data-sort-value="0.81" | 810 m || 
|-id=623 bgcolor=#fefefe
| 255623 ||  || — || August 13, 2006 || Palomar || NEAT || V || align=right data-sort-value="0.90" | 900 m || 
|-id=624 bgcolor=#fefefe
| 255624 ||  || — || August 14, 2006 || Siding Spring || SSS || — || align=right | 1.4 km || 
|-id=625 bgcolor=#E9E9E9
| 255625 ||  || — || August 14, 2006 || Siding Spring || SSS || JUN || align=right | 3.2 km || 
|-id=626 bgcolor=#fefefe
| 255626 ||  || — || August 12, 2006 || Palomar || NEAT || NYS || align=right data-sort-value="0.80" | 800 m || 
|-id=627 bgcolor=#fefefe
| 255627 ||  || — || August 15, 2006 || Palomar || NEAT || V || align=right data-sort-value="0.95" | 950 m || 
|-id=628 bgcolor=#fefefe
| 255628 ||  || — || August 14, 2006 || Palomar || NEAT || V || align=right | 1.5 km || 
|-id=629 bgcolor=#fefefe
| 255629 ||  || — || August 14, 2006 || Siding Spring || SSS || — || align=right data-sort-value="0.74" | 740 m || 
|-id=630 bgcolor=#fefefe
| 255630 ||  || — || August 16, 2006 || Siding Spring || SSS || V || align=right data-sort-value="0.85" | 850 m || 
|-id=631 bgcolor=#fefefe
| 255631 ||  || — || August 16, 2006 || Siding Spring || SSS || V || align=right data-sort-value="0.96" | 960 m || 
|-id=632 bgcolor=#fefefe
| 255632 ||  || — || August 17, 2006 || Palomar || NEAT || — || align=right | 1.1 km || 
|-id=633 bgcolor=#fefefe
| 255633 ||  || — || August 17, 2006 || Palomar || NEAT || SUL || align=right | 2.9 km || 
|-id=634 bgcolor=#fefefe
| 255634 ||  || — || August 17, 2006 || Palomar || NEAT || — || align=right | 1.0 km || 
|-id=635 bgcolor=#fefefe
| 255635 ||  || — || August 19, 2006 || Kitt Peak || Spacewatch || — || align=right | 1.0 km || 
|-id=636 bgcolor=#fefefe
| 255636 ||  || — || August 17, 2006 || Palomar || NEAT || NYS || align=right data-sort-value="0.87" | 870 m || 
|-id=637 bgcolor=#fefefe
| 255637 ||  || — || August 17, 2006 || Socorro || LINEAR || — || align=right | 1.1 km || 
|-id=638 bgcolor=#fefefe
| 255638 ||  || — || August 17, 2006 || Palomar || NEAT || — || align=right data-sort-value="0.95" | 950 m || 
|-id=639 bgcolor=#fefefe
| 255639 ||  || — || August 19, 2006 || Kitt Peak || Spacewatch || — || align=right | 1.1 km || 
|-id=640 bgcolor=#fefefe
| 255640 ||  || — || August 19, 2006 || Kitt Peak || Spacewatch || — || align=right data-sort-value="0.75" | 750 m || 
|-id=641 bgcolor=#fefefe
| 255641 ||  || — || August 19, 2006 || Palomar || NEAT || V || align=right data-sort-value="0.82" | 820 m || 
|-id=642 bgcolor=#fefefe
| 255642 ||  || — || August 16, 2006 || Siding Spring || SSS || NYS || align=right | 1.2 km || 
|-id=643 bgcolor=#fefefe
| 255643 ||  || — || August 16, 2006 || Siding Spring || SSS || — || align=right | 1.3 km || 
|-id=644 bgcolor=#fefefe
| 255644 ||  || — || August 17, 2006 || Palomar || NEAT || — || align=right data-sort-value="0.94" | 940 m || 
|-id=645 bgcolor=#fefefe
| 255645 ||  || — || August 17, 2006 || Palomar || NEAT || — || align=right data-sort-value="0.90" | 900 m || 
|-id=646 bgcolor=#fefefe
| 255646 ||  || — || August 17, 2006 || Palomar || NEAT || — || align=right | 1.1 km || 
|-id=647 bgcolor=#fefefe
| 255647 ||  || — || August 17, 2006 || Palomar || NEAT || — || align=right | 1.4 km || 
|-id=648 bgcolor=#fefefe
| 255648 ||  || — || August 17, 2006 || Palomar || NEAT || NYS || align=right data-sort-value="0.84" | 840 m || 
|-id=649 bgcolor=#fefefe
| 255649 ||  || — || August 17, 2006 || Palomar || NEAT || — || align=right | 1.2 km || 
|-id=650 bgcolor=#E9E9E9
| 255650 ||  || — || August 17, 2006 || Palomar || NEAT || — || align=right | 2.4 km || 
|-id=651 bgcolor=#fefefe
| 255651 ||  || — || August 19, 2006 || Kitt Peak || Spacewatch || NYS || align=right data-sort-value="0.78" | 780 m || 
|-id=652 bgcolor=#fefefe
| 255652 ||  || — || August 19, 2006 || Anderson Mesa || LONEOS || NYS || align=right | 1.7 km || 
|-id=653 bgcolor=#fefefe
| 255653 ||  || — || August 18, 2006 || Socorro || LINEAR || — || align=right | 1.3 km || 
|-id=654 bgcolor=#fefefe
| 255654 ||  || — || August 19, 2006 || Kitt Peak || Spacewatch || NYS || align=right data-sort-value="0.70" | 700 m || 
|-id=655 bgcolor=#E9E9E9
| 255655 ||  || — || August 19, 2006 || Kitt Peak || Spacewatch || — || align=right data-sort-value="0.92" | 920 m || 
|-id=656 bgcolor=#fefefe
| 255656 ||  || — || August 19, 2006 || Kitt Peak || Spacewatch || V || align=right data-sort-value="0.99" | 990 m || 
|-id=657 bgcolor=#fefefe
| 255657 ||  || — || August 20, 2006 || Palomar || NEAT || NYS || align=right data-sort-value="0.72" | 720 m || 
|-id=658 bgcolor=#fefefe
| 255658 ||  || — || August 21, 2006 || Socorro || LINEAR || NYS || align=right data-sort-value="0.91" | 910 m || 
|-id=659 bgcolor=#fefefe
| 255659 ||  || — || August 21, 2006 || Kitt Peak || Spacewatch || MAS || align=right data-sort-value="0.72" | 720 m || 
|-id=660 bgcolor=#fefefe
| 255660 ||  || — || August 16, 2006 || Siding Spring || SSS || — || align=right | 1.2 km || 
|-id=661 bgcolor=#fefefe
| 255661 ||  || — || August 21, 2006 || Palomar || NEAT || MAS || align=right | 1.1 km || 
|-id=662 bgcolor=#fefefe
| 255662 ||  || — || August 20, 2006 || Kitt Peak || Spacewatch || V || align=right data-sort-value="0.96" | 960 m || 
|-id=663 bgcolor=#fefefe
| 255663 ||  || — || August 21, 2006 || Palomar || NEAT || V || align=right data-sort-value="0.90" | 900 m || 
|-id=664 bgcolor=#fefefe
| 255664 ||  || — || August 22, 2006 || Palomar || NEAT || — || align=right | 1.4 km || 
|-id=665 bgcolor=#fefefe
| 255665 ||  || — || August 23, 2006 || Socorro || LINEAR || V || align=right | 1.1 km || 
|-id=666 bgcolor=#fefefe
| 255666 ||  || — || August 21, 2006 || Socorro || LINEAR || — || align=right | 1.1 km || 
|-id=667 bgcolor=#fefefe
| 255667 ||  || — || August 17, 2006 || Palomar || NEAT || NYS || align=right data-sort-value="0.83" | 830 m || 
|-id=668 bgcolor=#fefefe
| 255668 ||  || — || August 19, 2006 || Palomar || NEAT || — || align=right | 1.9 km || 
|-id=669 bgcolor=#fefefe
| 255669 ||  || — || August 16, 2006 || Siding Spring || SSS || V || align=right data-sort-value="0.92" | 920 m || 
|-id=670 bgcolor=#fefefe
| 255670 ||  || — || August 17, 2006 || Palomar || NEAT || V || align=right data-sort-value="0.70" | 700 m || 
|-id=671 bgcolor=#fefefe
| 255671 ||  || — || August 17, 2006 || Palomar || NEAT || — || align=right | 1.2 km || 
|-id=672 bgcolor=#fefefe
| 255672 ||  || — || August 17, 2006 || Palomar || NEAT || NYS || align=right | 1.0 km || 
|-id=673 bgcolor=#fefefe
| 255673 ||  || — || August 18, 2006 || Kitt Peak || Spacewatch || MAS || align=right | 1.1 km || 
|-id=674 bgcolor=#fefefe
| 255674 ||  || — || August 19, 2006 || Anderson Mesa || LONEOS || NYS || align=right data-sort-value="0.96" | 960 m || 
|-id=675 bgcolor=#E9E9E9
| 255675 ||  || — || August 19, 2006 || Anderson Mesa || LONEOS || — || align=right | 2.5 km || 
|-id=676 bgcolor=#fefefe
| 255676 ||  || — || August 20, 2006 || Palomar || NEAT || — || align=right | 1.0 km || 
|-id=677 bgcolor=#fefefe
| 255677 ||  || — || August 21, 2006 || Socorro || LINEAR || — || align=right | 1.2 km || 
|-id=678 bgcolor=#fefefe
| 255678 ||  || — || August 21, 2006 || Palomar || NEAT || NYS || align=right data-sort-value="0.75" | 750 m || 
|-id=679 bgcolor=#fefefe
| 255679 ||  || — || August 21, 2006 || Palomar || NEAT || — || align=right | 1.1 km || 
|-id=680 bgcolor=#fefefe
| 255680 ||  || — || August 21, 2006 || Palomar || NEAT || V || align=right data-sort-value="0.88" | 880 m || 
|-id=681 bgcolor=#fefefe
| 255681 ||  || — || August 22, 2006 || Palomar || NEAT || NYS || align=right data-sort-value="0.83" | 830 m || 
|-id=682 bgcolor=#fefefe
| 255682 ||  || — || August 23, 2006 || Palomar || NEAT || — || align=right | 1.9 km || 
|-id=683 bgcolor=#fefefe
| 255683 ||  || — || August 23, 2006 || Palomar || NEAT || — || align=right | 1.1 km || 
|-id=684 bgcolor=#fefefe
| 255684 ||  || — || August 23, 2006 || Palomar || NEAT || NYS || align=right data-sort-value="0.85" | 850 m || 
|-id=685 bgcolor=#fefefe
| 255685 ||  || — || August 16, 2006 || Siding Spring || SSS || — || align=right | 1.3 km || 
|-id=686 bgcolor=#fefefe
| 255686 ||  || — || August 21, 2006 || Socorro || LINEAR || NYS || align=right data-sort-value="0.78" | 780 m || 
|-id=687 bgcolor=#fefefe
| 255687 ||  || — || August 19, 2006 || Palomar || NEAT || V || align=right data-sort-value="0.93" | 930 m || 
|-id=688 bgcolor=#fefefe
| 255688 ||  || — || August 19, 2006 || Anderson Mesa || LONEOS || MAS || align=right data-sort-value="0.94" | 940 m || 
|-id=689 bgcolor=#fefefe
| 255689 ||  || — || August 20, 2006 || Palomar || NEAT || NYS || align=right data-sort-value="0.74" | 740 m || 
|-id=690 bgcolor=#fefefe
| 255690 ||  || — || August 21, 2006 || Palomar || NEAT || NYS || align=right data-sort-value="0.80" | 800 m || 
|-id=691 bgcolor=#fefefe
| 255691 ||  || — || August 21, 2006 || Palomar || NEAT || — || align=right | 1.8 km || 
|-id=692 bgcolor=#fefefe
| 255692 ||  || — || August 22, 2006 || Palomar || NEAT || MAS || align=right data-sort-value="0.86" | 860 m || 
|-id=693 bgcolor=#fefefe
| 255693 ||  || — || August 23, 2006 || Socorro || LINEAR || — || align=right | 1.3 km || 
|-id=694 bgcolor=#fefefe
| 255694 ||  || — || August 24, 2006 || Palomar || NEAT || — || align=right | 1.1 km || 
|-id=695 bgcolor=#fefefe
| 255695 ||  || — || August 25, 2006 || Hibiscus || S. F. Hönig || — || align=right | 1.1 km || 
|-id=696 bgcolor=#fefefe
| 255696 ||  || — || August 21, 2006 || Socorro || LINEAR || NYS || align=right data-sort-value="0.93" | 930 m || 
|-id=697 bgcolor=#fefefe
| 255697 ||  || — || August 24, 2006 || Palomar || NEAT || SUL || align=right | 3.1 km || 
|-id=698 bgcolor=#fefefe
| 255698 ||  || — || August 24, 2006 || Palomar || NEAT || — || align=right | 1.1 km || 
|-id=699 bgcolor=#fefefe
| 255699 ||  || — || August 27, 2006 || Kitt Peak || Spacewatch || NYS || align=right data-sort-value="0.80" | 800 m || 
|-id=700 bgcolor=#fefefe
| 255700 ||  || — || August 27, 2006 || Kitt Peak || Spacewatch || NYS || align=right data-sort-value="0.68" | 680 m || 
|}

255701–255800 

|-bgcolor=#fefefe
| 255701 ||  || — || August 27, 2006 || Kitt Peak || Spacewatch || — || align=right | 1.0 km || 
|-id=702 bgcolor=#fefefe
| 255702 ||  || — || August 27, 2006 || Kitt Peak || Spacewatch || — || align=right | 1.0 km || 
|-id=703 bgcolor=#fefefe
| 255703 Stetson ||  ||  || August 25, 2006 || Mauna Kea || D. D. Balam || SUL || align=right | 2.1 km || 
|-id=704 bgcolor=#fefefe
| 255704 ||  || — || August 16, 2006 || Palomar || NEAT || V || align=right data-sort-value="0.82" | 820 m || 
|-id=705 bgcolor=#E9E9E9
| 255705 ||  || — || August 16, 2006 || Palomar || NEAT || PAD || align=right | 2.5 km || 
|-id=706 bgcolor=#fefefe
| 255706 ||  || — || August 16, 2006 || Palomar || NEAT || NYS || align=right data-sort-value="0.77" | 770 m || 
|-id=707 bgcolor=#fefefe
| 255707 ||  || — || August 19, 2006 || Kitt Peak || Spacewatch || NYS || align=right data-sort-value="0.80" | 800 m || 
|-id=708 bgcolor=#fefefe
| 255708 ||  || — || August 23, 2006 || Palomar || NEAT || V || align=right | 1.0 km || 
|-id=709 bgcolor=#fefefe
| 255709 ||  || — || August 26, 2006 || Siding Spring || SSS || V || align=right data-sort-value="0.95" | 950 m || 
|-id=710 bgcolor=#fefefe
| 255710 ||  || — || August 28, 2006 || Catalina || CSS || NYS || align=right | 1.1 km || 
|-id=711 bgcolor=#E9E9E9
| 255711 ||  || — || August 28, 2006 || Socorro || LINEAR || — || align=right | 4.1 km || 
|-id=712 bgcolor=#fefefe
| 255712 ||  || — || August 28, 2006 || Catalina || CSS || — || align=right data-sort-value="0.86" | 860 m || 
|-id=713 bgcolor=#fefefe
| 255713 ||  || — || August 28, 2006 || Catalina || CSS || V || align=right data-sort-value="0.75" | 750 m || 
|-id=714 bgcolor=#fefefe
| 255714 ||  || — || August 27, 2006 || Anderson Mesa || LONEOS || V || align=right | 1.1 km || 
|-id=715 bgcolor=#fefefe
| 255715 ||  || — || August 27, 2006 || Anderson Mesa || LONEOS || NYS || align=right data-sort-value="0.92" | 920 m || 
|-id=716 bgcolor=#fefefe
| 255716 ||  || — || August 28, 2006 || Catalina || CSS || NYS || align=right data-sort-value="0.87" | 870 m || 
|-id=717 bgcolor=#fefefe
| 255717 ||  || — || August 29, 2006 || Catalina || CSS || — || align=right | 1.3 km || 
|-id=718 bgcolor=#fefefe
| 255718 ||  || — || August 29, 2006 || Catalina || CSS || V || align=right data-sort-value="0.90" | 900 m || 
|-id=719 bgcolor=#fefefe
| 255719 ||  || — || August 29, 2006 || Catalina || CSS || V || align=right data-sort-value="0.93" | 930 m || 
|-id=720 bgcolor=#fefefe
| 255720 ||  || — || August 29, 2006 || Catalina || CSS || — || align=right data-sort-value="0.92" | 920 m || 
|-id=721 bgcolor=#fefefe
| 255721 ||  || — || August 29, 2006 || Catalina || CSS || — || align=right data-sort-value="0.92" | 920 m || 
|-id=722 bgcolor=#fefefe
| 255722 ||  || — || August 29, 2006 || Catalina || CSS || — || align=right | 1.0 km || 
|-id=723 bgcolor=#fefefe
| 255723 ||  || — || August 16, 2006 || Palomar || NEAT || NYS || align=right data-sort-value="0.74" | 740 m || 
|-id=724 bgcolor=#fefefe
| 255724 ||  || — || August 16, 2006 || Palomar || NEAT || V || align=right data-sort-value="0.90" | 900 m || 
|-id=725 bgcolor=#fefefe
| 255725 ||  || — || August 16, 2006 || Siding Spring || SSS || — || align=right | 1.2 km || 
|-id=726 bgcolor=#fefefe
| 255726 ||  || — || August 17, 2006 || Palomar || NEAT || FLO || align=right | 1.1 km || 
|-id=727 bgcolor=#fefefe
| 255727 ||  || — || August 17, 2006 || Palomar || NEAT || NYS || align=right | 2.7 km || 
|-id=728 bgcolor=#fefefe
| 255728 ||  || — || August 22, 2006 || Palomar || NEAT || — || align=right | 1.3 km || 
|-id=729 bgcolor=#fefefe
| 255729 ||  || — || August 23, 2006 || Socorro || LINEAR || NYS || align=right | 1.0 km || 
|-id=730 bgcolor=#fefefe
| 255730 ||  || — || August 23, 2006 || Palomar || NEAT || FLO || align=right data-sort-value="0.81" | 810 m || 
|-id=731 bgcolor=#fefefe
| 255731 ||  || — || August 28, 2006 || Anderson Mesa || LONEOS || V || align=right data-sort-value="0.96" | 960 m || 
|-id=732 bgcolor=#fefefe
| 255732 ||  || — || August 28, 2006 || Socorro || LINEAR || ERI || align=right | 2.7 km || 
|-id=733 bgcolor=#E9E9E9
| 255733 ||  || — || August 29, 2006 || Anderson Mesa || LONEOS || DOR || align=right | 4.1 km || 
|-id=734 bgcolor=#E9E9E9
| 255734 ||  || — || August 16, 2006 || Palomar || NEAT || — || align=right | 1.3 km || 
|-id=735 bgcolor=#fefefe
| 255735 ||  || — || August 16, 2006 || Palomar || NEAT || — || align=right | 1.1 km || 
|-id=736 bgcolor=#fefefe
| 255736 ||  || — || August 16, 2006 || Palomar || NEAT || — || align=right | 1.9 km || 
|-id=737 bgcolor=#fefefe
| 255737 ||  || — || August 28, 2006 || Catalina || CSS || NYS || align=right data-sort-value="0.94" | 940 m || 
|-id=738 bgcolor=#fefefe
| 255738 ||  || — || August 18, 2006 || Kitt Peak || Spacewatch || MAS || align=right data-sort-value="0.94" | 940 m || 
|-id=739 bgcolor=#E9E9E9
| 255739 ||  || — || August 18, 2006 || Kitt Peak || Spacewatch || — || align=right | 1.7 km || 
|-id=740 bgcolor=#fefefe
| 255740 ||  || — || August 19, 2006 || Kitt Peak || Spacewatch || NYS || align=right data-sort-value="0.76" | 760 m || 
|-id=741 bgcolor=#fefefe
| 255741 ||  || — || August 29, 2006 || Catalina || CSS || — || align=right data-sort-value="0.98" | 980 m || 
|-id=742 bgcolor=#fefefe
| 255742 ||  || — || August 21, 2006 || Kitt Peak || Spacewatch || — || align=right | 1.0 km || 
|-id=743 bgcolor=#E9E9E9
| 255743 ||  || — || September 4, 2006 || Wrightwood || J. W. Young || — || align=right | 2.7 km || 
|-id=744 bgcolor=#fefefe
| 255744 ||  || — || September 12, 2006 || Anderson Mesa || LONEOS || — || align=right | 2.2 km || 
|-id=745 bgcolor=#fefefe
| 255745 ||  || — || September 12, 2006 || Socorro || LINEAR || — || align=right | 1.3 km || 
|-id=746 bgcolor=#fefefe
| 255746 ||  || — || September 14, 2006 || Catalina || CSS || — || align=right | 1.1 km || 
|-id=747 bgcolor=#fefefe
| 255747 ||  || — || September 12, 2006 || Catalina || CSS || — || align=right | 1.1 km || 
|-id=748 bgcolor=#fefefe
| 255748 ||  || — || September 13, 2006 || Palomar || NEAT || NYS || align=right data-sort-value="0.89" | 890 m || 
|-id=749 bgcolor=#fefefe
| 255749 ||  || — || September 14, 2006 || Catalina || CSS || — || align=right data-sort-value="0.98" | 980 m || 
|-id=750 bgcolor=#fefefe
| 255750 ||  || — || September 14, 2006 || Palomar || NEAT || — || align=right | 1.0 km || 
|-id=751 bgcolor=#E9E9E9
| 255751 ||  || — || September 14, 2006 || Catalina || CSS || — || align=right | 1.1 km || 
|-id=752 bgcolor=#fefefe
| 255752 ||  || — || September 15, 2006 || Kitt Peak || Spacewatch || NYS || align=right data-sort-value="0.94" | 940 m || 
|-id=753 bgcolor=#E9E9E9
| 255753 ||  || — || September 14, 2006 || Palomar || NEAT || — || align=right | 1.7 km || 
|-id=754 bgcolor=#fefefe
| 255754 ||  || — || September 14, 2006 || Palomar || NEAT || V || align=right data-sort-value="0.78" | 780 m || 
|-id=755 bgcolor=#E9E9E9
| 255755 ||  || — || September 14, 2006 || Palomar || NEAT || BAR || align=right | 1.7 km || 
|-id=756 bgcolor=#fefefe
| 255756 ||  || — || September 15, 2006 || Kitt Peak || Spacewatch || ERI || align=right | 2.6 km || 
|-id=757 bgcolor=#fefefe
| 255757 ||  || — || September 15, 2006 || Socorro || LINEAR || — || align=right | 2.0 km || 
|-id=758 bgcolor=#fefefe
| 255758 ||  || — || September 14, 2006 || Catalina || CSS || NYS || align=right data-sort-value="0.90" | 900 m || 
|-id=759 bgcolor=#E9E9E9
| 255759 ||  || — || September 14, 2006 || Catalina || CSS || — || align=right data-sort-value="0.68" | 680 m || 
|-id=760 bgcolor=#fefefe
| 255760 ||  || — || September 14, 2006 || Kitt Peak || Spacewatch || NYS || align=right data-sort-value="0.87" | 870 m || 
|-id=761 bgcolor=#fefefe
| 255761 ||  || — || September 14, 2006 || Kitt Peak || Spacewatch || — || align=right data-sort-value="0.85" | 850 m || 
|-id=762 bgcolor=#E9E9E9
| 255762 ||  || — || September 14, 2006 || Kitt Peak || Spacewatch || KON || align=right | 3.9 km || 
|-id=763 bgcolor=#fefefe
| 255763 ||  || — || September 14, 2006 || Kitt Peak || Spacewatch || MAS || align=right | 1.1 km || 
|-id=764 bgcolor=#E9E9E9
| 255764 ||  || — || September 14, 2006 || Kitt Peak || Spacewatch || — || align=right data-sort-value="0.92" | 920 m || 
|-id=765 bgcolor=#E9E9E9
| 255765 ||  || — || September 14, 2006 || Kitt Peak || Spacewatch || — || align=right | 1.1 km || 
|-id=766 bgcolor=#fefefe
| 255766 ||  || — || September 14, 2006 || Kitt Peak || Spacewatch || ERI || align=right | 2.4 km || 
|-id=767 bgcolor=#E9E9E9
| 255767 ||  || — || September 14, 2006 || Catalina || CSS || — || align=right | 1.7 km || 
|-id=768 bgcolor=#E9E9E9
| 255768 ||  || — || September 15, 2006 || Kitt Peak || Spacewatch || — || align=right | 1.7 km || 
|-id=769 bgcolor=#fefefe
| 255769 ||  || — || September 15, 2006 || Kitt Peak || Spacewatch || NYS || align=right | 1.1 km || 
|-id=770 bgcolor=#E9E9E9
| 255770 ||  || — || September 15, 2006 || Kitt Peak || Spacewatch || — || align=right | 1.8 km || 
|-id=771 bgcolor=#fefefe
| 255771 ||  || — || September 14, 2006 || Palomar || NEAT || — || align=right data-sort-value="0.91" | 910 m || 
|-id=772 bgcolor=#E9E9E9
| 255772 ||  || — || September 14, 2006 || Kitt Peak || Spacewatch || — || align=right | 1.9 km || 
|-id=773 bgcolor=#fefefe
| 255773 ||  || — || September 15, 2006 || Kitt Peak || Spacewatch || MAS || align=right data-sort-value="0.81" | 810 m || 
|-id=774 bgcolor=#E9E9E9
| 255774 ||  || — || September 15, 2006 || Kitt Peak || Spacewatch || — || align=right | 1.0 km || 
|-id=775 bgcolor=#fefefe
| 255775 ||  || — || September 15, 2006 || Kitt Peak || Spacewatch || MAS || align=right data-sort-value="0.81" | 810 m || 
|-id=776 bgcolor=#E9E9E9
| 255776 ||  || — || September 15, 2006 || Kitt Peak || Spacewatch || — || align=right | 1.1 km || 
|-id=777 bgcolor=#fefefe
| 255777 ||  || — || September 15, 2006 || Kitt Peak || Spacewatch || NYS || align=right data-sort-value="0.77" | 770 m || 
|-id=778 bgcolor=#E9E9E9
| 255778 ||  || — || September 15, 2006 || Kitt Peak || Spacewatch || RAF || align=right data-sort-value="0.87" | 870 m || 
|-id=779 bgcolor=#E9E9E9
| 255779 ||  || — || September 15, 2006 || Kitt Peak || Spacewatch || MAR || align=right | 1.1 km || 
|-id=780 bgcolor=#fefefe
| 255780 ||  || — || September 15, 2006 || Kitt Peak || Spacewatch || — || align=right | 1.2 km || 
|-id=781 bgcolor=#fefefe
| 255781 ||  || — || September 15, 2006 || Kitt Peak || Spacewatch || — || align=right | 1.0 km || 
|-id=782 bgcolor=#E9E9E9
| 255782 ||  || — || September 15, 2006 || Kitt Peak || Spacewatch || — || align=right data-sort-value="0.80" | 800 m || 
|-id=783 bgcolor=#E9E9E9
| 255783 ||  || — || September 15, 2006 || Kitt Peak || Spacewatch || — || align=right | 1.5 km || 
|-id=784 bgcolor=#E9E9E9
| 255784 ||  || — || September 15, 2006 || Kitt Peak || Spacewatch || — || align=right data-sort-value="0.98" | 980 m || 
|-id=785 bgcolor=#E9E9E9
| 255785 ||  || — || September 15, 2006 || Kitt Peak || Spacewatch || — || align=right | 1.8 km || 
|-id=786 bgcolor=#fefefe
| 255786 ||  || — || September 14, 2006 || Kitt Peak || Spacewatch || — || align=right | 1.4 km || 
|-id=787 bgcolor=#fefefe
| 255787 ||  || — || September 14, 2006 || Catalina || CSS || — || align=right | 1.3 km || 
|-id=788 bgcolor=#fefefe
| 255788 ||  || — || September 14, 2006 || Catalina || CSS || — || align=right | 1.4 km || 
|-id=789 bgcolor=#fefefe
| 255789 ||  || — || September 14, 2006 || Catalina || CSS || V || align=right data-sort-value="0.96" | 960 m || 
|-id=790 bgcolor=#E9E9E9
| 255790 ||  || — || September 16, 2006 || Catalina || CSS || RAF || align=right | 1.3 km || 
|-id=791 bgcolor=#fefefe
| 255791 ||  || — || September 16, 2006 || Anderson Mesa || LONEOS || V || align=right data-sort-value="0.85" | 850 m || 
|-id=792 bgcolor=#fefefe
| 255792 ||  || — || September 18, 2006 || Hibiscus || S. F. Hönig || ERI || align=right | 2.1 km || 
|-id=793 bgcolor=#E9E9E9
| 255793 ||  || — || September 16, 2006 || Catalina || CSS || — || align=right | 1.9 km || 
|-id=794 bgcolor=#E9E9E9
| 255794 ||  || — || September 16, 2006 || Catalina || CSS || — || align=right | 2.9 km || 
|-id=795 bgcolor=#fefefe
| 255795 ||  || — || September 16, 2006 || Anderson Mesa || LONEOS || PHO || align=right | 1.7 km || 
|-id=796 bgcolor=#fefefe
| 255796 ||  || — || September 16, 2006 || Kitt Peak || Spacewatch || — || align=right | 1.1 km || 
|-id=797 bgcolor=#fefefe
| 255797 ||  || — || September 16, 2006 || Socorro || LINEAR || — || align=right | 1.2 km || 
|-id=798 bgcolor=#fefefe
| 255798 ||  || — || September 17, 2006 || Socorro || LINEAR || — || align=right | 2.3 km || 
|-id=799 bgcolor=#fefefe
| 255799 ||  || — || September 17, 2006 || Catalina || CSS || FLO || align=right | 1.1 km || 
|-id=800 bgcolor=#E9E9E9
| 255800 ||  || — || September 17, 2006 || Catalina || CSS || WIT || align=right | 1.3 km || 
|}

255801–255900 

|-bgcolor=#E9E9E9
| 255801 ||  || — || September 17, 2006 || Kitt Peak || Spacewatch || — || align=right | 1.3 km || 
|-id=802 bgcolor=#fefefe
| 255802 ||  || — || September 17, 2006 || Catalina || CSS || — || align=right data-sort-value="0.87" | 870 m || 
|-id=803 bgcolor=#fefefe
| 255803 ||  || — || September 17, 2006 || Anderson Mesa || LONEOS || — || align=right | 1.3 km || 
|-id=804 bgcolor=#E9E9E9
| 255804 ||  || — || September 16, 2006 || Catalina || CSS || — || align=right | 1.5 km || 
|-id=805 bgcolor=#fefefe
| 255805 ||  || — || September 16, 2006 || Anderson Mesa || LONEOS || SUL || align=right | 2.7 km || 
|-id=806 bgcolor=#fefefe
| 255806 ||  || — || September 17, 2006 || Kitt Peak || Spacewatch || — || align=right | 1.0 km || 
|-id=807 bgcolor=#E9E9E9
| 255807 ||  || — || September 17, 2006 || Catalina || CSS || — || align=right | 1.4 km || 
|-id=808 bgcolor=#E9E9E9
| 255808 ||  || — || September 17, 2006 || Kitt Peak || Spacewatch || — || align=right | 1.3 km || 
|-id=809 bgcolor=#fefefe
| 255809 ||  || — || September 18, 2006 || Catalina || CSS || NYS || align=right | 1.0 km || 
|-id=810 bgcolor=#E9E9E9
| 255810 ||  || — || September 18, 2006 || Anderson Mesa || LONEOS || — || align=right | 1.2 km || 
|-id=811 bgcolor=#fefefe
| 255811 ||  || — || September 18, 2006 || Anderson Mesa || LONEOS || CLA || align=right | 2.2 km || 
|-id=812 bgcolor=#fefefe
| 255812 ||  || — || September 18, 2006 || Jarnac || Jarnac Obs. || V || align=right data-sort-value="0.93" | 930 m || 
|-id=813 bgcolor=#E9E9E9
| 255813 ||  || — || September 16, 2006 || Catalina || CSS || JUN || align=right | 1.2 km || 
|-id=814 bgcolor=#E9E9E9
| 255814 ||  || — || September 19, 2006 || La Sagra || OAM Obs. || — || align=right | 1.3 km || 
|-id=815 bgcolor=#fefefe
| 255815 ||  || — || September 17, 2006 || Anderson Mesa || LONEOS || — || align=right | 1.4 km || 
|-id=816 bgcolor=#fefefe
| 255816 ||  || — || September 19, 2006 || Catalina || CSS || — || align=right data-sort-value="0.85" | 850 m || 
|-id=817 bgcolor=#fefefe
| 255817 ||  || — || September 18, 2006 || Catalina || CSS || NYS || align=right data-sort-value="0.93" | 930 m || 
|-id=818 bgcolor=#E9E9E9
| 255818 ||  || — || September 18, 2006 || Catalina || CSS || — || align=right | 1.6 km || 
|-id=819 bgcolor=#fefefe
| 255819 ||  || — || September 21, 2006 || Ottmarsheim || Ottmarsheim Obs. || NYS || align=right data-sort-value="0.79" | 790 m || 
|-id=820 bgcolor=#fefefe
| 255820 ||  || — || September 17, 2006 || Catalina || CSS || V || align=right data-sort-value="0.90" | 900 m || 
|-id=821 bgcolor=#fefefe
| 255821 ||  || — || September 19, 2006 || Kitt Peak || Spacewatch || — || align=right | 1.4 km || 
|-id=822 bgcolor=#E9E9E9
| 255822 ||  || — || September 19, 2006 || Kitt Peak || Spacewatch || — || align=right data-sort-value="0.94" | 940 m || 
|-id=823 bgcolor=#fefefe
| 255823 ||  || — || September 19, 2006 || Kitt Peak || Spacewatch || — || align=right | 1.2 km || 
|-id=824 bgcolor=#E9E9E9
| 255824 ||  || — || September 19, 2006 || Kitt Peak || Spacewatch || — || align=right | 1.0 km || 
|-id=825 bgcolor=#E9E9E9
| 255825 ||  || — || September 19, 2006 || Kitt Peak || Spacewatch || — || align=right | 1.4 km || 
|-id=826 bgcolor=#fefefe
| 255826 ||  || — || September 19, 2006 || Kitt Peak || Spacewatch || CLA || align=right | 2.0 km || 
|-id=827 bgcolor=#E9E9E9
| 255827 ||  || — || September 18, 2006 || Kitt Peak || Spacewatch || — || align=right | 1.7 km || 
|-id=828 bgcolor=#fefefe
| 255828 ||  || — || September 18, 2006 || Kitt Peak || Spacewatch || MASfast? || align=right data-sort-value="0.68" | 680 m || 
|-id=829 bgcolor=#E9E9E9
| 255829 ||  || — || September 18, 2006 || Kitt Peak || Spacewatch || — || align=right | 1.4 km || 
|-id=830 bgcolor=#E9E9E9
| 255830 ||  || — || September 18, 2006 || Kitt Peak || Spacewatch || MAR || align=right | 1.1 km || 
|-id=831 bgcolor=#E9E9E9
| 255831 ||  || — || September 18, 2006 || Kitt Peak || Spacewatch || — || align=right | 1.7 km || 
|-id=832 bgcolor=#E9E9E9
| 255832 ||  || — || September 18, 2006 || Kitt Peak || Spacewatch || — || align=right | 1.2 km || 
|-id=833 bgcolor=#E9E9E9
| 255833 ||  || — || September 18, 2006 || Kitt Peak || Spacewatch || — || align=right data-sort-value="0.82" | 820 m || 
|-id=834 bgcolor=#fefefe
| 255834 ||  || — || September 18, 2006 || Kitt Peak || Spacewatch || NYS || align=right data-sort-value="0.82" | 820 m || 
|-id=835 bgcolor=#E9E9E9
| 255835 ||  || — || September 18, 2006 || Kitt Peak || Spacewatch || — || align=right | 1.2 km || 
|-id=836 bgcolor=#E9E9E9
| 255836 ||  || — || September 18, 2006 || Kitt Peak || Spacewatch || — || align=right | 2.0 km || 
|-id=837 bgcolor=#fefefe
| 255837 ||  || — || September 19, 2006 || Kitt Peak || Spacewatch || NYS || align=right data-sort-value="0.90" | 900 m || 
|-id=838 bgcolor=#fefefe
| 255838 ||  || — || September 19, 2006 || Kitt Peak || Spacewatch || NYS || align=right data-sort-value="0.80" | 800 m || 
|-id=839 bgcolor=#E9E9E9
| 255839 ||  || — || September 19, 2006 || Kitt Peak || Spacewatch || — || align=right | 1.6 km || 
|-id=840 bgcolor=#E9E9E9
| 255840 ||  || — || September 19, 2006 || Kitt Peak || Spacewatch || — || align=right | 2.8 km || 
|-id=841 bgcolor=#fefefe
| 255841 ||  || — || September 20, 2006 || Catalina || CSS || — || align=right | 1.4 km || 
|-id=842 bgcolor=#fefefe
| 255842 ||  || — || September 22, 2006 || Kitt Peak || Spacewatch || V || align=right data-sort-value="0.82" | 820 m || 
|-id=843 bgcolor=#E9E9E9
| 255843 ||  || — || September 24, 2006 || Kitt Peak || Spacewatch || — || align=right data-sort-value="0.86" | 860 m || 
|-id=844 bgcolor=#E9E9E9
| 255844 ||  || — || September 24, 2006 || Kitt Peak || Spacewatch || — || align=right | 1.3 km || 
|-id=845 bgcolor=#fefefe
| 255845 ||  || — || September 24, 2006 || Kitt Peak || Spacewatch || — || align=right data-sort-value="0.92" | 920 m || 
|-id=846 bgcolor=#E9E9E9
| 255846 ||  || — || September 18, 2006 || Catalina || CSS || — || align=right | 2.2 km || 
|-id=847 bgcolor=#fefefe
| 255847 ||  || — || September 20, 2006 || Catalina || CSS || — || align=right | 1.1 km || 
|-id=848 bgcolor=#E9E9E9
| 255848 ||  || — || September 20, 2006 || Anderson Mesa || LONEOS || — || align=right | 2.8 km || 
|-id=849 bgcolor=#fefefe
| 255849 ||  || — || September 19, 2006 || Catalina || CSS || NYS || align=right data-sort-value="0.84" | 840 m || 
|-id=850 bgcolor=#fefefe
| 255850 ||  || — || September 19, 2006 || Kitt Peak || Spacewatch || V || align=right data-sort-value="0.70" | 700 m || 
|-id=851 bgcolor=#fefefe
| 255851 ||  || — || September 19, 2006 || Kitt Peak || Spacewatch || — || align=right | 1.2 km || 
|-id=852 bgcolor=#fefefe
| 255852 ||  || — || September 19, 2006 || Kitt Peak || Spacewatch || — || align=right data-sort-value="0.83" | 830 m || 
|-id=853 bgcolor=#fefefe
| 255853 ||  || — || September 19, 2006 || Kitt Peak || Spacewatch || NYS || align=right data-sort-value="0.78" | 780 m || 
|-id=854 bgcolor=#fefefe
| 255854 ||  || — || September 20, 2006 || Catalina || CSS || — || align=right | 1.0 km || 
|-id=855 bgcolor=#fefefe
| 255855 ||  || — || September 20, 2006 || Palomar || NEAT || — || align=right | 1.1 km || 
|-id=856 bgcolor=#fefefe
| 255856 ||  || — || September 20, 2006 || Palomar || NEAT || — || align=right | 1.3 km || 
|-id=857 bgcolor=#E9E9E9
| 255857 ||  || — || September 23, 2006 || Kitt Peak || Spacewatch || — || align=right | 1.5 km || 
|-id=858 bgcolor=#fefefe
| 255858 ||  || — || September 23, 2006 || Kitt Peak || Spacewatch || NYS || align=right data-sort-value="0.78" | 780 m || 
|-id=859 bgcolor=#E9E9E9
| 255859 ||  || — || September 24, 2006 || Kitt Peak || Spacewatch || — || align=right | 1.2 km || 
|-id=860 bgcolor=#fefefe
| 255860 ||  || — || September 25, 2006 || Kitt Peak || Spacewatch || SUL || align=right | 3.4 km || 
|-id=861 bgcolor=#E9E9E9
| 255861 ||  || — || September 25, 2006 || Kitt Peak || Spacewatch || ADE || align=right | 3.5 km || 
|-id=862 bgcolor=#fefefe
| 255862 ||  || — || September 25, 2006 || Kitt Peak || Spacewatch || NYS || align=right data-sort-value="0.76" | 760 m || 
|-id=863 bgcolor=#fefefe
| 255863 ||  || — || September 25, 2006 || Kitt Peak || Spacewatch || V || align=right data-sort-value="0.77" | 770 m || 
|-id=864 bgcolor=#E9E9E9
| 255864 ||  || — || September 25, 2006 || Kitt Peak || Spacewatch || — || align=right | 1.1 km || 
|-id=865 bgcolor=#E9E9E9
| 255865 ||  || — || September 25, 2006 || Kitt Peak || Spacewatch || — || align=right data-sort-value="0.97" | 970 m || 
|-id=866 bgcolor=#E9E9E9
| 255866 ||  || — || September 25, 2006 || Mount Lemmon || Mount Lemmon Survey || — || align=right | 1.5 km || 
|-id=867 bgcolor=#E9E9E9
| 255867 ||  || — || September 25, 2006 || Mount Lemmon || Mount Lemmon Survey || — || align=right | 1.2 km || 
|-id=868 bgcolor=#fefefe
| 255868 ||  || — || September 26, 2006 || Kitt Peak || Spacewatch || V || align=right data-sort-value="0.88" | 880 m || 
|-id=869 bgcolor=#E9E9E9
| 255869 ||  || — || September 26, 2006 || Kitt Peak || Spacewatch || — || align=right | 1.3 km || 
|-id=870 bgcolor=#E9E9E9
| 255870 ||  || — || September 26, 2006 || Kitt Peak || Spacewatch || — || align=right | 1.3 km || 
|-id=871 bgcolor=#fefefe
| 255871 ||  || — || September 25, 2006 || Mount Lemmon || Mount Lemmon Survey || — || align=right data-sort-value="0.77" | 770 m || 
|-id=872 bgcolor=#E9E9E9
| 255872 ||  || — || September 26, 2006 || Socorro || LINEAR || — || align=right | 1.3 km || 
|-id=873 bgcolor=#E9E9E9
| 255873 ||  || — || September 26, 2006 || Catalina || CSS || RAF || align=right | 1.6 km || 
|-id=874 bgcolor=#E9E9E9
| 255874 ||  || — || September 27, 2006 || Mount Lemmon || Mount Lemmon Survey || — || align=right | 3.0 km || 
|-id=875 bgcolor=#E9E9E9
| 255875 ||  || — || September 25, 2006 || Mount Lemmon || Mount Lemmon Survey || — || align=right | 1.0 km || 
|-id=876 bgcolor=#fefefe
| 255876 ||  || — || September 25, 2006 || Mount Lemmon || Mount Lemmon Survey || — || align=right | 1.2 km || 
|-id=877 bgcolor=#E9E9E9
| 255877 ||  || — || September 25, 2006 || Mount Lemmon || Mount Lemmon Survey || — || align=right | 2.3 km || 
|-id=878 bgcolor=#fefefe
| 255878 ||  || — || September 26, 2006 || Kitt Peak || Spacewatch || MAS || align=right data-sort-value="0.87" | 870 m || 
|-id=879 bgcolor=#fefefe
| 255879 ||  || — || September 26, 2006 || Kitt Peak || Spacewatch || MAS || align=right data-sort-value="0.85" | 850 m || 
|-id=880 bgcolor=#fefefe
| 255880 ||  || — || September 26, 2006 || Kitt Peak || Spacewatch || V || align=right data-sort-value="0.80" | 800 m || 
|-id=881 bgcolor=#E9E9E9
| 255881 ||  || — || September 26, 2006 || Mount Lemmon || Mount Lemmon Survey || — || align=right | 1.3 km || 
|-id=882 bgcolor=#fefefe
| 255882 ||  || — || September 26, 2006 || Kitt Peak || Spacewatch || NYS || align=right data-sort-value="0.82" | 820 m || 
|-id=883 bgcolor=#fefefe
| 255883 ||  || — || September 26, 2006 || Mount Lemmon || Mount Lemmon Survey || NYS || align=right | 1.0 km || 
|-id=884 bgcolor=#E9E9E9
| 255884 ||  || — || September 26, 2006 || Mount Lemmon || Mount Lemmon Survey || MIS || align=right | 2.5 km || 
|-id=885 bgcolor=#E9E9E9
| 255885 ||  || — || September 26, 2006 || Kitt Peak || Spacewatch || — || align=right | 3.0 km || 
|-id=886 bgcolor=#fefefe
| 255886 ||  || — || September 26, 2006 || Kitt Peak || Spacewatch || SUL || align=right | 2.8 km || 
|-id=887 bgcolor=#E9E9E9
| 255887 ||  || — || September 26, 2006 || Mount Lemmon || Mount Lemmon Survey || MRX || align=right | 1.3 km || 
|-id=888 bgcolor=#fefefe
| 255888 ||  || — || September 27, 2006 || Socorro || LINEAR || — || align=right | 1.0 km || 
|-id=889 bgcolor=#E9E9E9
| 255889 ||  || — || September 27, 2006 || Mount Lemmon || Mount Lemmon Survey || — || align=right | 1.1 km || 
|-id=890 bgcolor=#E9E9E9
| 255890 ||  || — || September 27, 2006 || Mount Lemmon || Mount Lemmon Survey || — || align=right | 1.5 km || 
|-id=891 bgcolor=#E9E9E9
| 255891 ||  || — || September 27, 2006 || Mount Lemmon || Mount Lemmon Survey || — || align=right | 1.9 km || 
|-id=892 bgcolor=#E9E9E9
| 255892 ||  || — || September 27, 2006 || Mount Lemmon || Mount Lemmon Survey || — || align=right | 2.6 km || 
|-id=893 bgcolor=#E9E9E9
| 255893 ||  || — || September 28, 2006 || Catalina || CSS || — || align=right | 3.2 km || 
|-id=894 bgcolor=#fefefe
| 255894 ||  || — || September 27, 2006 || Catalina || CSS || — || align=right | 1.0 km || 
|-id=895 bgcolor=#E9E9E9
| 255895 ||  || — || September 19, 2006 || Catalina || CSS || — || align=right | 1.7 km || 
|-id=896 bgcolor=#fefefe
| 255896 ||  || — || September 26, 2006 || Catalina || CSS || — || align=right | 1.4 km || 
|-id=897 bgcolor=#E9E9E9
| 255897 ||  || — || September 27, 2006 || Socorro || LINEAR || — || align=right | 1.4 km || 
|-id=898 bgcolor=#E9E9E9
| 255898 ||  || — || September 25, 2006 || Kitt Peak || Spacewatch || — || align=right | 1.1 km || 
|-id=899 bgcolor=#E9E9E9
| 255899 ||  || — || September 25, 2006 || Mount Lemmon || Mount Lemmon Survey || MAR || align=right | 1.2 km || 
|-id=900 bgcolor=#E9E9E9
| 255900 ||  || — || September 25, 2006 || Kitt Peak || Spacewatch || — || align=right | 1.5 km || 
|}

255901–256000 

|-bgcolor=#fefefe
| 255901 ||  || — || September 27, 2006 || Socorro || LINEAR || EUT || align=right data-sort-value="0.91" | 910 m || 
|-id=902 bgcolor=#E9E9E9
| 255902 ||  || — || September 27, 2006 || Kitt Peak || Spacewatch || HOF || align=right | 2.7 km || 
|-id=903 bgcolor=#fefefe
| 255903 ||  || — || September 27, 2006 || Kitt Peak || Spacewatch || — || align=right | 1.1 km || 
|-id=904 bgcolor=#E9E9E9
| 255904 ||  || — || September 27, 2006 || Kitt Peak || Spacewatch || — || align=right data-sort-value="0.82" | 820 m || 
|-id=905 bgcolor=#E9E9E9
| 255905 ||  || — || September 27, 2006 || Kitt Peak || Spacewatch || — || align=right | 1.1 km || 
|-id=906 bgcolor=#E9E9E9
| 255906 ||  || — || September 27, 2006 || Kitt Peak || Spacewatch || GER || align=right | 2.0 km || 
|-id=907 bgcolor=#E9E9E9
| 255907 ||  || — || September 27, 2006 || Kitt Peak || Spacewatch || — || align=right data-sort-value="0.87" | 870 m || 
|-id=908 bgcolor=#fefefe
| 255908 ||  || — || September 27, 2006 || Kitt Peak || Spacewatch || MAS || align=right | 1.0 km || 
|-id=909 bgcolor=#fefefe
| 255909 ||  || — || September 28, 2006 || Kitt Peak || Spacewatch || — || align=right | 1.0 km || 
|-id=910 bgcolor=#fefefe
| 255910 ||  || — || September 28, 2006 || Kitt Peak || Spacewatch || — || align=right | 1.4 km || 
|-id=911 bgcolor=#fefefe
| 255911 ||  || — || September 28, 2006 || Kitt Peak || Spacewatch || NYS || align=right data-sort-value="0.65" | 650 m || 
|-id=912 bgcolor=#fefefe
| 255912 ||  || — || September 30, 2006 || Catalina || CSS || — || align=right | 1.4 km || 
|-id=913 bgcolor=#E9E9E9
| 255913 ||  || — || September 30, 2006 || Catalina || CSS || — || align=right | 1.2 km || 
|-id=914 bgcolor=#E9E9E9
| 255914 ||  || — || September 30, 2006 || Catalina || CSS || EUN || align=right | 1.4 km || 
|-id=915 bgcolor=#E9E9E9
| 255915 ||  || — || September 30, 2006 || Mount Lemmon || Mount Lemmon Survey || — || align=right | 1.2 km || 
|-id=916 bgcolor=#E9E9E9
| 255916 ||  || — || September 30, 2006 || Mount Lemmon || Mount Lemmon Survey || — || align=right data-sort-value="0.92" | 920 m || 
|-id=917 bgcolor=#E9E9E9
| 255917 ||  || — || September 30, 2006 || Catalina || CSS || — || align=right | 1.6 km || 
|-id=918 bgcolor=#E9E9E9
| 255918 ||  || — || September 30, 2006 || Mount Lemmon || Mount Lemmon Survey || — || align=right data-sort-value="0.92" | 920 m || 
|-id=919 bgcolor=#E9E9E9
| 255919 ||  || — || September 30, 2006 || Catalina || CSS || — || align=right | 3.1 km || 
|-id=920 bgcolor=#E9E9E9
| 255920 ||  || — || September 30, 2006 || Catalina || CSS || — || align=right | 1.3 km || 
|-id=921 bgcolor=#E9E9E9
| 255921 ||  || — || September 30, 2006 || Mount Lemmon || Mount Lemmon Survey || — || align=right | 1.1 km || 
|-id=922 bgcolor=#fefefe
| 255922 ||  || — || September 16, 2006 || Catalina || CSS || — || align=right | 2.9 km || 
|-id=923 bgcolor=#E9E9E9
| 255923 ||  || — || September 25, 2006 || Catalina || CSS || — || align=right | 1.7 km || 
|-id=924 bgcolor=#E9E9E9
| 255924 ||  || — || September 30, 2006 || Apache Point || A. C. Becker || — || align=right | 2.5 km || 
|-id=925 bgcolor=#E9E9E9
| 255925 ||  || — || September 30, 2006 || Apache Point || A. C. Becker || — || align=right | 5.9 km || 
|-id=926 bgcolor=#E9E9E9
| 255926 ||  || — || September 17, 2006 || Catalina || CSS || — || align=right | 2.9 km || 
|-id=927 bgcolor=#E9E9E9
| 255927 ||  || — || September 18, 2006 || Catalina || CSS || EUN || align=right | 1.7 km || 
|-id=928 bgcolor=#E9E9E9
| 255928 ||  || — || September 26, 2006 || Mount Lemmon || Mount Lemmon Survey || — || align=right data-sort-value="0.96" | 960 m || 
|-id=929 bgcolor=#E9E9E9
| 255929 ||  || — || September 28, 2006 || Mount Lemmon || Mount Lemmon Survey || HEN || align=right | 1.4 km || 
|-id=930 bgcolor=#E9E9E9
| 255930 ||  || — || September 19, 2006 || Catalina || CSS || — || align=right | 1.7 km || 
|-id=931 bgcolor=#fefefe
| 255931 ||  || — || September 25, 2006 || Mount Lemmon || Mount Lemmon Survey || MAS || align=right data-sort-value="0.86" | 860 m || 
|-id=932 bgcolor=#E9E9E9
| 255932 ||  || — || September 30, 2006 || Mount Lemmon || Mount Lemmon Survey || MAR || align=right | 1.5 km || 
|-id=933 bgcolor=#E9E9E9
| 255933 ||  || — || September 19, 2006 || Catalina || CSS || — || align=right | 2.8 km || 
|-id=934 bgcolor=#E9E9E9
| 255934 ||  || — || September 19, 2006 || Catalina || CSS || MIT || align=right | 3.5 km || 
|-id=935 bgcolor=#E9E9E9
| 255935 ||  || — || September 17, 2006 || Catalina || CSS || — || align=right | 3.7 km || 
|-id=936 bgcolor=#E9E9E9
| 255936 ||  || — || October 1, 2006 || Kitt Peak || Spacewatch || — || align=right | 1.8 km || 
|-id=937 bgcolor=#E9E9E9
| 255937 ||  || — || October 2, 2006 || Mount Lemmon || Mount Lemmon Survey || — || align=right data-sort-value="0.99" | 990 m || 
|-id=938 bgcolor=#E9E9E9
| 255938 ||  || — || October 12, 2006 || Calvin-Rehoboth || L. A. Molnar || — || align=right | 1.00 km || 
|-id=939 bgcolor=#E9E9E9
| 255939 ||  || — || October 13, 2006 || Calvin-Rehoboth || L. A. Molnar || — || align=right | 1.2 km || 
|-id=940 bgcolor=#fefefe
| 255940 ||  || — || October 14, 2006 || Dax || Dax Obs. || NYS || align=right data-sort-value="0.94" | 940 m || 
|-id=941 bgcolor=#E9E9E9
| 255941 ||  || — || October 3, 2006 || Kitt Peak || Spacewatch || — || align=right | 3.1 km || 
|-id=942 bgcolor=#E9E9E9
| 255942 ||  || — || October 15, 2006 || Kitt Peak || Spacewatch || — || align=right | 2.6 km || 
|-id=943 bgcolor=#E9E9E9
| 255943 ||  || — || October 10, 2006 || Palomar || NEAT || — || align=right | 2.1 km || 
|-id=944 bgcolor=#E9E9E9
| 255944 ||  || — || October 11, 2006 || Kitt Peak || Spacewatch || MAR || align=right | 1.5 km || 
|-id=945 bgcolor=#E9E9E9
| 255945 ||  || — || October 11, 2006 || Kitt Peak || Spacewatch || — || align=right | 1.3 km || 
|-id=946 bgcolor=#E9E9E9
| 255946 ||  || — || October 11, 2006 || Kitt Peak || Spacewatch || — || align=right | 2.4 km || 
|-id=947 bgcolor=#E9E9E9
| 255947 ||  || — || October 11, 2006 || Kitt Peak || Spacewatch || — || align=right | 1.3 km || 
|-id=948 bgcolor=#E9E9E9
| 255948 ||  || — || October 11, 2006 || Kitt Peak || Spacewatch || — || align=right | 1.4 km || 
|-id=949 bgcolor=#E9E9E9
| 255949 ||  || — || October 11, 2006 || Kitt Peak || Spacewatch || — || align=right | 1.8 km || 
|-id=950 bgcolor=#fefefe
| 255950 ||  || — || October 11, 2006 || Kitt Peak || Spacewatch || — || align=right | 1.0 km || 
|-id=951 bgcolor=#E9E9E9
| 255951 ||  || — || October 12, 2006 || Kitt Peak || Spacewatch || MAR || align=right | 1.4 km || 
|-id=952 bgcolor=#E9E9E9
| 255952 ||  || — || October 12, 2006 || Kitt Peak || Spacewatch || — || align=right | 2.4 km || 
|-id=953 bgcolor=#E9E9E9
| 255953 ||  || — || October 12, 2006 || Kitt Peak || Spacewatch || — || align=right | 1.2 km || 
|-id=954 bgcolor=#E9E9E9
| 255954 ||  || — || October 12, 2006 || Kitt Peak || Spacewatch || MAR || align=right | 1.4 km || 
|-id=955 bgcolor=#E9E9E9
| 255955 ||  || — || October 12, 2006 || Kitt Peak || Spacewatch || — || align=right | 1.1 km || 
|-id=956 bgcolor=#E9E9E9
| 255956 ||  || — || October 12, 2006 || Kitt Peak || Spacewatch || — || align=right | 1.8 km || 
|-id=957 bgcolor=#E9E9E9
| 255957 ||  || — || October 12, 2006 || Kitt Peak || Spacewatch || — || align=right | 1.7 km || 
|-id=958 bgcolor=#E9E9E9
| 255958 ||  || — || October 12, 2006 || Kitt Peak || Spacewatch || — || align=right | 1.6 km || 
|-id=959 bgcolor=#fefefe
| 255959 ||  || — || October 12, 2006 || Kitt Peak || Spacewatch || CLA || align=right | 2.5 km || 
|-id=960 bgcolor=#E9E9E9
| 255960 ||  || — || October 12, 2006 || Kitt Peak || Spacewatch || — || align=right | 1.2 km || 
|-id=961 bgcolor=#E9E9E9
| 255961 ||  || — || October 12, 2006 || Kitt Peak || Spacewatch || — || align=right | 1.6 km || 
|-id=962 bgcolor=#E9E9E9
| 255962 ||  || — || October 12, 2006 || Kitt Peak || Spacewatch || — || align=right | 1.1 km || 
|-id=963 bgcolor=#E9E9E9
| 255963 ||  || — || October 12, 2006 || Kitt Peak || Spacewatch || — || align=right | 1.2 km || 
|-id=964 bgcolor=#E9E9E9
| 255964 ||  || — || October 12, 2006 || Kitt Peak || Spacewatch || XIZ || align=right | 1.4 km || 
|-id=965 bgcolor=#E9E9E9
| 255965 ||  || — || October 12, 2006 || Kitt Peak || Spacewatch || — || align=right | 1.9 km || 
|-id=966 bgcolor=#E9E9E9
| 255966 ||  || — || October 12, 2006 || Kitt Peak || Spacewatch || — || align=right | 2.0 km || 
|-id=967 bgcolor=#E9E9E9
| 255967 ||  || — || October 12, 2006 || Kitt Peak || Spacewatch || — || align=right | 1.3 km || 
|-id=968 bgcolor=#E9E9E9
| 255968 ||  || — || October 12, 2006 || Kitt Peak || Spacewatch || — || align=right | 1.6 km || 
|-id=969 bgcolor=#E9E9E9
| 255969 ||  || — || October 12, 2006 || Kitt Peak || Spacewatch || — || align=right | 1.5 km || 
|-id=970 bgcolor=#E9E9E9
| 255970 ||  || — || October 12, 2006 || Kitt Peak || Spacewatch || — || align=right | 2.5 km || 
|-id=971 bgcolor=#E9E9E9
| 255971 ||  || — || October 12, 2006 || Kitt Peak || Spacewatch || — || align=right | 2.4 km || 
|-id=972 bgcolor=#E9E9E9
| 255972 ||  || — || October 12, 2006 || Palomar || NEAT || — || align=right | 2.0 km || 
|-id=973 bgcolor=#E9E9E9
| 255973 ||  || — || October 12, 2006 || Kitt Peak || Spacewatch || — || align=right | 2.0 km || 
|-id=974 bgcolor=#E9E9E9
| 255974 ||  || — || October 12, 2006 || Kitt Peak || Spacewatch || — || align=right | 2.5 km || 
|-id=975 bgcolor=#E9E9E9
| 255975 ||  || — || October 12, 2006 || Kitt Peak || Spacewatch || — || align=right | 1.3 km || 
|-id=976 bgcolor=#E9E9E9
| 255976 ||  || — || October 12, 2006 || Kitt Peak || Spacewatch || — || align=right | 2.0 km || 
|-id=977 bgcolor=#E9E9E9
| 255977 ||  || — || October 10, 2006 || Palomar || NEAT || EUN || align=right | 1.8 km || 
|-id=978 bgcolor=#fefefe
| 255978 ||  || — || October 11, 2006 || Palomar || NEAT || — || align=right | 1.4 km || 
|-id=979 bgcolor=#fefefe
| 255979 ||  || — || October 11, 2006 || Palomar || NEAT || — || align=right | 1.2 km || 
|-id=980 bgcolor=#E9E9E9
| 255980 ||  || — || October 11, 2006 || Palomar || NEAT || — || align=right | 1.0 km || 
|-id=981 bgcolor=#d6d6d6
| 255981 ||  || — || October 11, 2006 || Palomar || NEAT || HIL3:2 || align=right | 7.3 km || 
|-id=982 bgcolor=#E9E9E9
| 255982 ||  || — || October 12, 2006 || Palomar || NEAT || — || align=right | 2.2 km || 
|-id=983 bgcolor=#E9E9E9
| 255983 ||  || — || October 12, 2006 || Kitt Peak || Spacewatch || — || align=right | 1.6 km || 
|-id=984 bgcolor=#E9E9E9
| 255984 ||  || — || October 12, 2006 || Kitt Peak || Spacewatch || EUN || align=right | 2.1 km || 
|-id=985 bgcolor=#E9E9E9
| 255985 ||  || — || October 12, 2006 || Kitt Peak || Spacewatch || — || align=right | 1.6 km || 
|-id=986 bgcolor=#E9E9E9
| 255986 ||  || — || October 13, 2006 || Kitt Peak || Spacewatch || — || align=right | 1.1 km || 
|-id=987 bgcolor=#E9E9E9
| 255987 ||  || — || October 13, 2006 || Kitt Peak || Spacewatch || — || align=right | 1.1 km || 
|-id=988 bgcolor=#E9E9E9
| 255988 ||  || — || October 13, 2006 || Kitt Peak || Spacewatch || RAF || align=right | 1.5 km || 
|-id=989 bgcolor=#E9E9E9
| 255989 Dengyushian ||  ||  || October 15, 2006 || Lulin Observatory || C.-S. Lin, Q.-z. Ye || — || align=right | 1.8 km || 
|-id=990 bgcolor=#E9E9E9
| 255990 ||  || — || October 15, 2006 || Kitt Peak || Spacewatch || — || align=right | 1.8 km || 
|-id=991 bgcolor=#fefefe
| 255991 ||  || — || October 15, 2006 || Kitt Peak || Spacewatch || V || align=right data-sort-value="0.88" | 880 m || 
|-id=992 bgcolor=#d6d6d6
| 255992 ||  || — || October 15, 2006 || Kitt Peak || Spacewatch || — || align=right | 2.9 km || 
|-id=993 bgcolor=#E9E9E9
| 255993 ||  || — || October 15, 2006 || Kitt Peak || Spacewatch || — || align=right | 1.1 km || 
|-id=994 bgcolor=#E9E9E9
| 255994 ||  || — || October 15, 2006 || Kitt Peak || Spacewatch || — || align=right | 1.1 km || 
|-id=995 bgcolor=#E9E9E9
| 255995 ||  || — || October 12, 2006 || Palomar || NEAT || — || align=right | 3.0 km || 
|-id=996 bgcolor=#E9E9E9
| 255996 ||  || — || October 15, 2006 || Kitt Peak || Spacewatch || — || align=right | 2.0 km || 
|-id=997 bgcolor=#E9E9E9
| 255997 ||  || — || October 15, 2006 || Catalina || CSS || — || align=right | 1.1 km || 
|-id=998 bgcolor=#E9E9E9
| 255998 ||  || — || October 4, 2006 || Mount Lemmon || Mount Lemmon Survey || — || align=right | 2.6 km || 
|-id=999 bgcolor=#E9E9E9
| 255999 ||  || — || October 13, 2006 || Kitt Peak || Spacewatch || — || align=right | 1.4 km || 
|-id=000 bgcolor=#E9E9E9
| 256000 ||  || — || October 13, 2006 || Kitt Peak || Spacewatch || — || align=right | 1.5 km || 
|}

References

External links 
 Discovery Circumstances: Numbered Minor Planets (255001)–(260000) (IAU Minor Planet Center)

0255